= Externalities of cars =

Impacts of car use

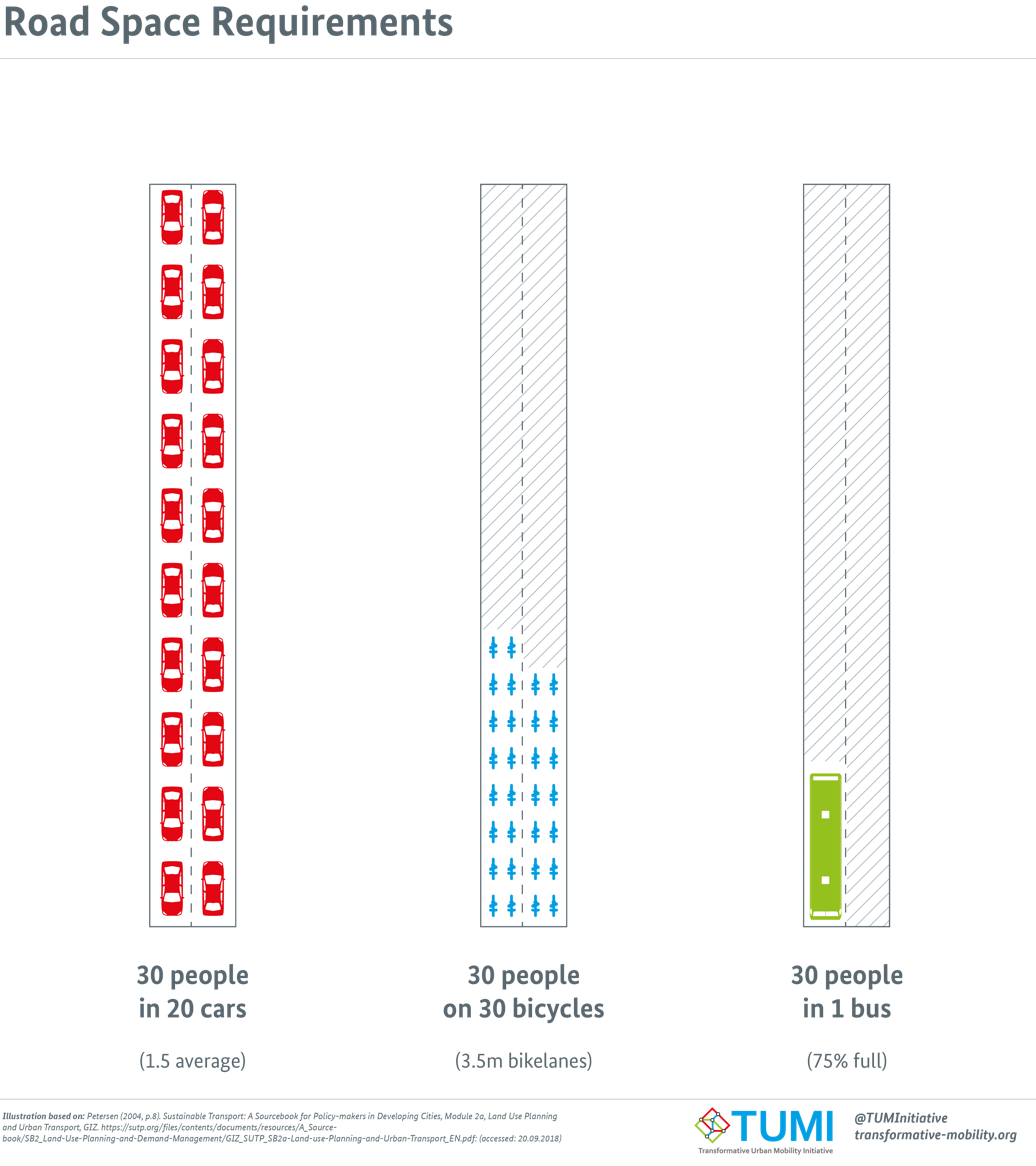
Road space requirements

The externalities of automobiles, similar to other economic externalities, represent the measurable costs imposed on those who do not own the vehicle, in contrast to the costs borne by the vehicle owner. These externalities include factors such as air pollution, noise, traffic congestion, and road maintenance costs, which affect the broader community and environment. Additionally, these externalities contribute to social injustice, as disadvantaged communities often bear a disproportionate share of these negative impacts.

According to Harvard University, the main externalities of driving are local and global pollution, oil dependence, traffic congestion and traffic collisions; while according to a meta-study conducted by the Delft University these externalities are congestion and scarcity costs, accident costs, air pollution costs, noise costs, climate change costs, costs for nature and landscape, costs for water pollution, costs for soil pollution and costs of energy dependency. An estimated 1,670,000 people die each year due to cars, that is 1 in 34 deaths, many because of air pollution rather than crashes.

== Negative externalities ==
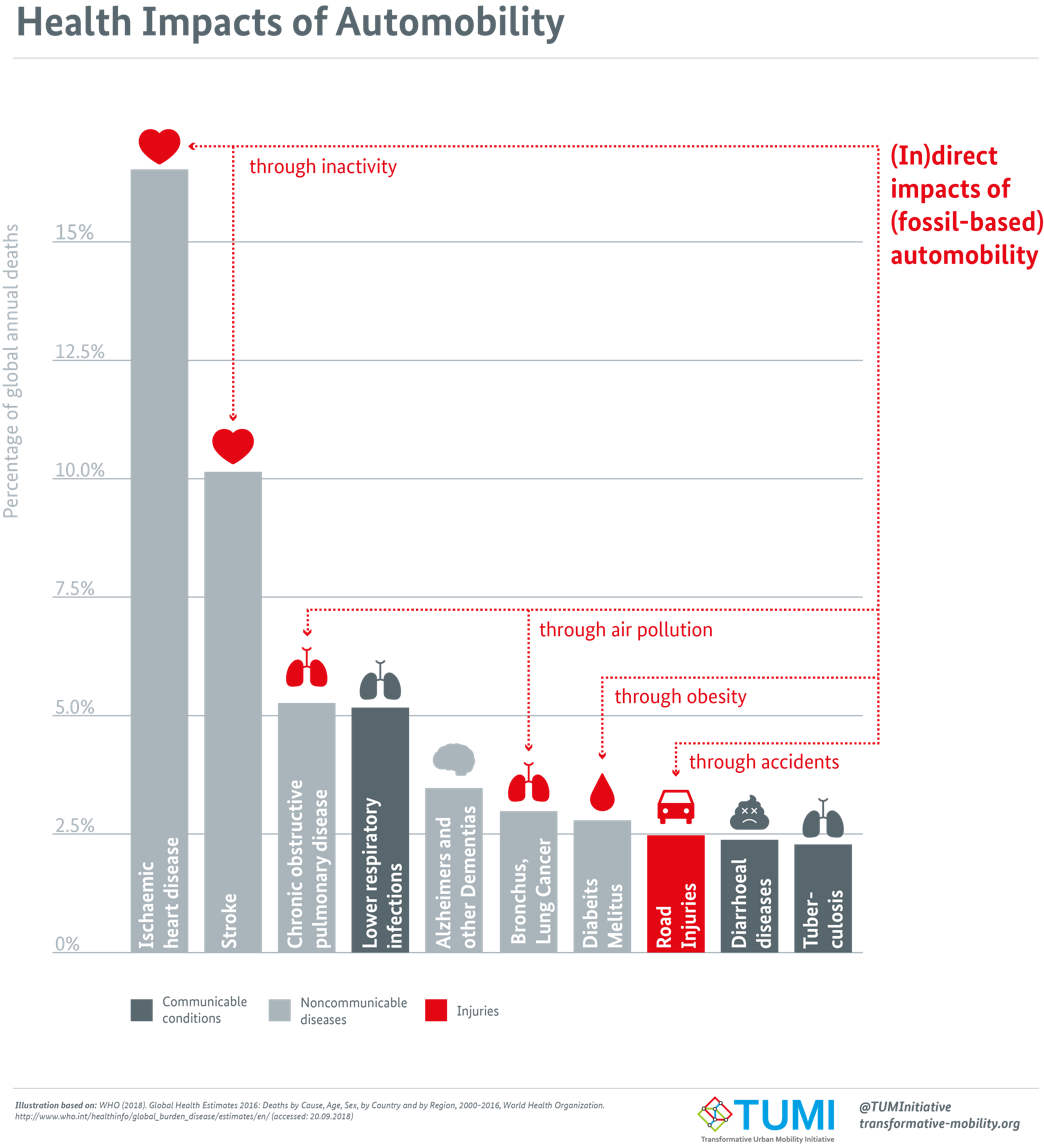
Health impacts of automobility

The negative externalities can be substantial, since the driver does not take into account, for example, the negative effects of air pollution on third parties, when they opt to drive their car. Legislators and regulators can internalize those external costs, either by taxes on fuels for example, either by any kind of limitation to car usage, such as parking meters or urban tolls. Nevertheless, it seems the drivers in some countries already pay some external costs by taxes. Road taxes in the Netherlands, for instance, have a relatively high yearly value which covers the maintenance of the infrastructure. Nevertheless, in the majority of western nations, the external costs of driving are not covered totally, either by taxes, or by any kind of car usage limitation.

=== Traffic congestion and scarcity ===
Increased reliance on the automobile leads to increased road congestion. The externalities of automobiles, similar to other economic externalities, represent the measurable costs imposed on those who do not own the vehicle, in contrast to the costs borne by the vehicle owner. These externalities include factors such as air pollution, noise, traffic congestion, and road maintenance costs, which affect the broader community and environment. Additionally, these externalities contribute to social injustice, as disadvantaged communities often bear a disproportionate share of these negative impacts. While expansions in road capacity are often touted as relieving congestion, induced demand often means that any reductions in congestion are temporary.

=== Collisions ===
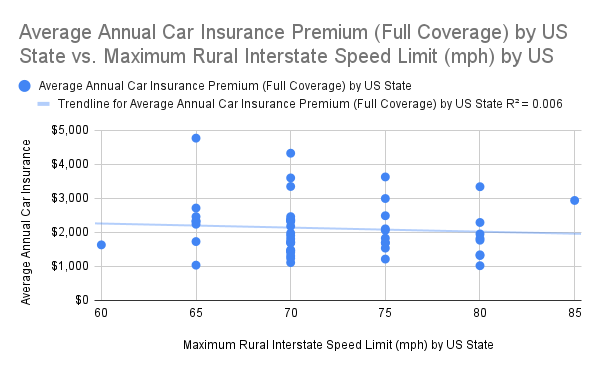

Cars are the leading cause of fatal collisions in many countries, and are the leading cause of death of youth and children. In 2010, car crashes in the United States resulted in 32,999 deaths and a projected $871 billion cost to society, around 6% of the United States 2010 GDP. Road traffic collisions cause social costs including material damages, administrative costs, medical costs, production losses and immaterial costs. Immaterial costs are lifetime shortening, suffering as well as for example pain or sorrow, which can arise from death injuries. Material costs are often covered by insurance and also market price of these costs are available. This does not, however, hold for any immaterial costs and proxy cost factors because these costs are not sufficiently covered by private insurance systems.

=== Air pollution ===
Cars produce numerous harmful air pollutants in their exhaust such as NO_{x}, particulate matter and ground-level ozone (indirectly). Additionally, as car tires wear down, they shed the materials they are made of into the air as particulate pollution. Those pollutants are known to cause various respiratory and other health issues and cars are among the leading cause of smog in modern developed world cities. External costs which can arise from using cars and trucks in everyday life are of different kinds (covering also material costs such as damages to buildings and materials), but health costs are the most common. In this case cars might cause cardiovascular and respiratory diseases. Such costs have to be paid by the society as a whole.

There is quite a high number of available studies on the methodology of air pollution costs as well as applications of these methods.

=== Noise ===
Cars significantly contribute to noise pollution. While one common perception the engine is the main cause for noise, tire noise becomes the dominant source of noise above 20–30 miles per hour (30–50 km/h) for passenger vehicles. Although aerodynamic noise does increase at highway speeds, it contributes less than tire noise unless at very high speeds.

Persistent traffic noise above 40 dB(A) is known to disrupt sleep, and above 55 dB(A) is known to increase the risk of cardiovascular disease. In Germany, 2.9% of myocardial infarction cases can be attributed to road traffic noise, with the 1.5% of the population exposed to greater than 75 dB(A) accounting for 27.13% of that. In total, an estimated 800,023 Disability-adjusted life years are lost due in urban populations due to road traffic noise in the EU. In the United States, 13.2% of the population is potentially exposed to road noise above 45 dB(A), with 5.5% exposed to road noise above 55 dB(A).

=== Climate change ===
Climate change is significantly caused by human activity, particularly the production of greenhouse gasses and their release into the atmosphere. About 16% of manmade carbon dioxide is from road transport, mostly passenger vehicles. Gasoline cars with less than two passengers produce more carbon dioxide per passenger kilometer than any other form of land transport.

The changing speed of a vehicle is a factor when considering the measurement of greenhouse gas emissions. Traffic congestion can be dangerous because of its effects on society. Besides the increasing risk of injuries arising primarily from high-grade roads together with the high noise, the main consequence of traffic congestion is increasing level of emissions of greenhouse gases. In addition to that nitrogen oxides from cars have a minor indirect greenhouse effect.

=== Costs for nature and landscape ===
Roads, parking spaces but also suburban sprawl caused by cars need significant amount of space. Typically, once agricultural or uncultivated land is turned over into ever wider motorways and ever larger parking lots to accommodate the automobile but induced demand means any relief is temporary and more and more surfaces are sealed in the process.

=== Costs for water pollution ===
Lubricants and fuels used by automobiles are harmful when they leak into the groundwater. Oil refineries and particularly the mining of unconventional oil like oil shales and oil sands can be extremely harmful for the surrounding water resources and bodies of water.

In addition to that runoff of impervious surfaces like roads or parking lots can be contaminated with all sorts of pollutants.

=== Costs for soil pollution ===
In addition to the fertile topsoil often "buried" under freeways and parking spaces, cars directly or indirectly release pollutants into the soil. Oil may leak into the groundwater and the common practice to clean cars in the front yard causes surfactants and other products in the cleaning products to pollute the ground. Similarly, salt is often used to keep roads and highways free of snow and ice and chlorides cause major damage to vegetation as well as being an aggressive substance linked to rust and corrosion.

=== Costs of energy dependency ===
While trains and tramway often run on electricity which can be generated through renewable sources or locally available fuel, cars by and large run on petroleum derived fuels. Only a handful of countries are net exporters of petroleum. For developed countries this causes a political dependence on a reliable petroleum supply and has been cited as the reason for foreign policy decisions of the United States among others. For developing countries, petroleum products can be among the chief imports and reliance on automobiles can significantly impact the trade deficit and public debt of such nations.

=== Obesity ===
Some research indicates a correlation between urban sprawl and obesity. Car centric development and lack of walkability lead to less use of active modes of transportation such as utility cycling and walking which is linked to various health issues caused by a lack of exercise.

== Solutions to negative externalities ==
=== Pigovian taxes ===
Pigovian taxes are one solution used for correcting negative externalities caused by automobiles. By increasing the cost of using automobiles, it is possible to reduce consumption to an economically optimal level while raising tax revenue. This could be achieved through the use of fuel taxes and road taxes, which might be used for infrastructure investment and repair. However meeting all negative externalities by fuel tax is politically difficult. In the case of carbon taxes, revenue could be used for investment in environmentally friendly initiatives. Fuel and carbon taxes have been criticized as being a regressive tax, that affect low income individuals greater than high earners. As a result, the Canadian government has used a portion of tax revenue from carbon taxes to rebate lower income households.

=== Congestion pricing ===
Major cities such as London and Stockholm have introduced congestion pricing in order to reduce traffic and pollution in their city centres. This is implemented as a toll on automobiles entering the city centre during peak hours. This toll aims to correct the negative externalities and change consumer behaviour, by making consumers more aware of the costs induced by their consumption. Congestion pricing is an efficient way at reducing traffic externalities, as monitoring technology allows prices to adapt to changes in traffic levels. This added toll reduces congestion, encourages the use of public transit, and raises revenue from tolls.

=== Subsidizing alternatives ===
Many governments have begun subsidizing electric vehicles. With the intention of correcting the positive externality that electric vehicles contribute to the environment. This has been implemented through the use of tax credits, purchase rebates, and tax exemptions. These subsidies reduce the cost of Zero-emissions vehicle and as a result increase demand. By incentivizing consumers to reduce their purchases of petrol vehicles in favour of electric cars, there is a decrease in negative externalities associated with emissions. There has been backlash against the equity of these subsidies, stating that these subsidies favour the wealthy. It has been suggested that subsidizing ebikes and car charging stations would be fairer.

=== Regulation ===
The use of emission standards on automobiles, reduces the amount of pollutants emitted by new automobiles thus reducing negative environmental externalities. This is an important piece in regulating automobile externalities, as emission levels per litre of gasoline consumed are not reduced by fuel taxes. The European Union has set a target of 95g of CO_{2} per kilometre by 2021. Emission limits are based on mass of automobiles with heavier vehicles having higher limits. Manufacturers who miss this target are charged with increasing costs for each gram of additional pollution. This policy serves to regulate pollution while accounting for unmeasured costs placed by automobiles on the environment.

== Positive externalities ==
While the existence of negative externalities seems consensual, the existence of positive externalities of the automobile does not have consensus amongst economists and experts in the transportation sector. The creation of jobs or the fact that the related industries pay taxes, cannot be considered, as such, as positive externalities, because any legal economic activity pays taxes, and the big majority also needs job demand. Time saving to the driver, and therefore, eventually more personal production, cannot either be considered a positive externality, because the driver has already taken those factors into account when they opted to use their car, and therefore these factors cannot be considered, by many authors, a pure externality.

=== Accessibility and land value ===
Notwithstanding the above objections, some authors enumerate positive externalities for the automobile like accessibility and land value. Where land is expensive, it is developed more intensively. Where it is more intensively developed, there are more activities and destinations that can be reached in a given time. Where there are more activities, accessibility is higher and where accessibility is higher, land is more expensive.

=== City growth ===
Economists have sought to understand why cities grow and why large cities seem to be at an advantage relative to others. One explanation that has received much attention emphasizes the role of agglomeration economies in facilitating and sustaining city growth. The clustering of firms and workers in cities generates positive externalities by allowing for labor market pooling, input sharing, and knowledge spillovers.

Nevertheless, some other economists mention urban decay and urban sprawl as a negative effect or cost of the automobile, when the city grows due to automobile dependency.

Most large cities currently require most of their food to be trucked in by motor vehicle. Historic Paris is a counterexample, using up to 1/6 of its landspace for growing food.

Furthermore, most large cities extensively rely on urban rail of some form and it is often argued that their functioning would be severely diminished without the existence of said urban rail system.

== See also ==
- Alternatives to car use
- Car costs
- Car dependency
- Car-free movement
- Economics of car use
- Effects of the car on societies
- Environmental effects of transport
- Exhaust gas
- Food desert
- Food swamp
- Full cost accounting
- Mobile source air pollution
- Motor vehicle fatality rate in U.S. by year
- Reclaim the Streets
- Roadway air dispersion modeling
- Whole-life cost
- Transit desert
- Accessibility (transport)
