= Service life =

Period of time where an object can fulfill a function

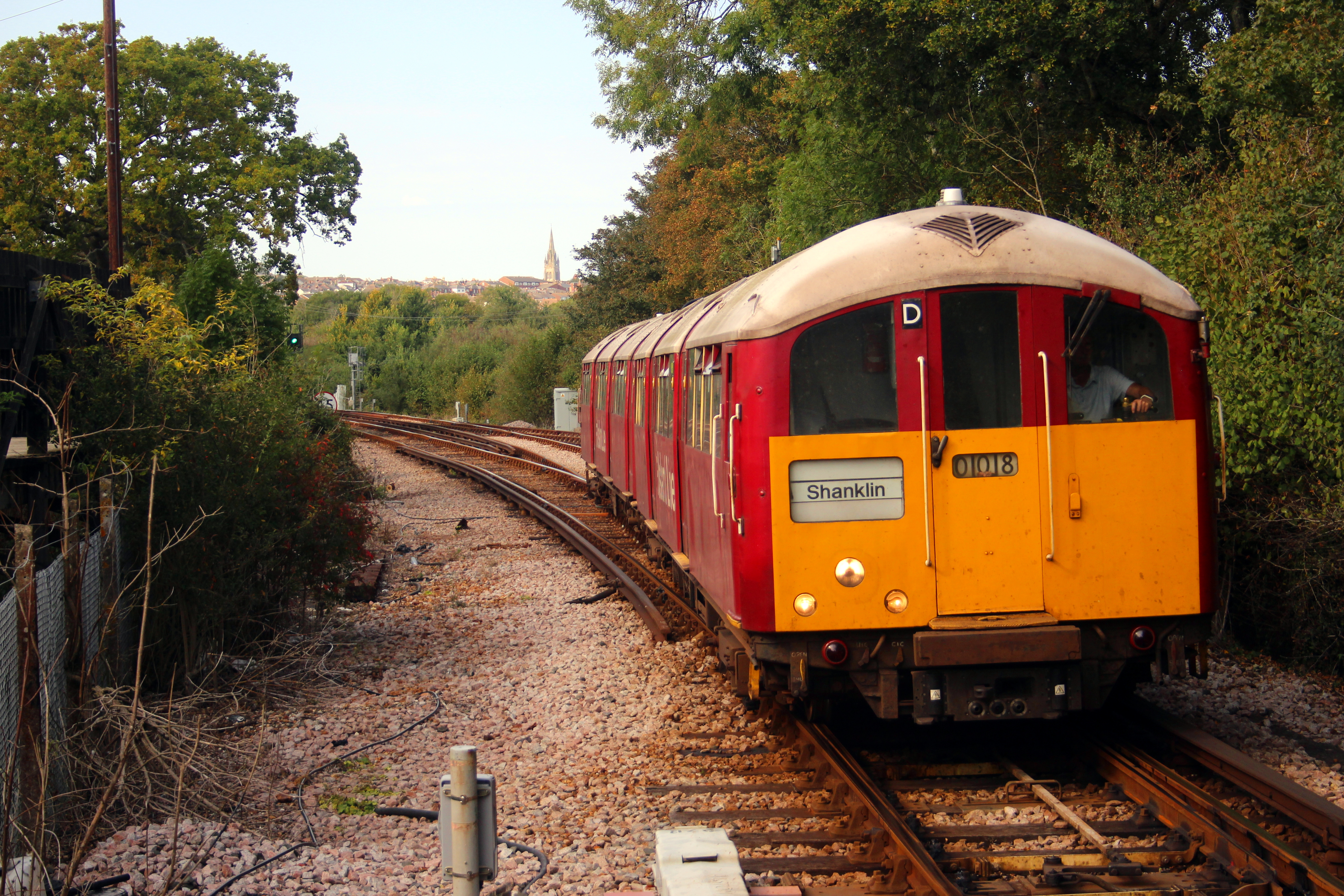
British Rail Class 483 trains, first built in 1938, were 83 years old when they were withdrawn from the Isle of Wight in January 2021; they were the oldest trains in Great Britain remaining in regular passenger service at the time. That honour was passed to the currently 54 year old London Underground 1972 Stock trains still in service on the Bakerloo line.

A product's service life is its period of use in service. Several related terms describe more precisely a product's life, from the point of manufacture, storage, and distribution, and eventual use. Service life has been defined as "a product's total life in use from the point of sale to the point of discard" and distinguished from replacement life, "the period after which the initial purchaser returns to the shop for a replacement". Determining a product's expected service life as part of business policy (product life cycle management) involves using tools and calculations from maintainability and reliability analysis. Service life represents a commitment made by the item's manufacturer and is usually specified as a median. It is the time that any manufactured item can be expected to be "serviceable" or supported by its manufacturer.

Service life is not to be confused with shelf life, which deals with storage time, or with technical life, which is the maximum period during which it can physically function. Service life also differs from predicted life, in terms of mean time before failure (MTBF) or maintenance-free operating period (MFOP). Predicted life is useful such that a manufacturer may estimate, by hypothetical modeling and calculation, a general rule for which it will honor warranty claims, or planning for mission fulfillment. The difference between service life and predicted life is most clear when considering mission time and reliability in comparison to MTBF and service life. For example, a missile system can have a mission time of less than one minute, service life of 20 years, active MTBF of 20 minutes, dormant MTBF of 50 years, and reliability of 99.9999%.

Consumers will have different expectations about service life and longevity based upon factors such as use, cost, and quality.

== Product strategy ==
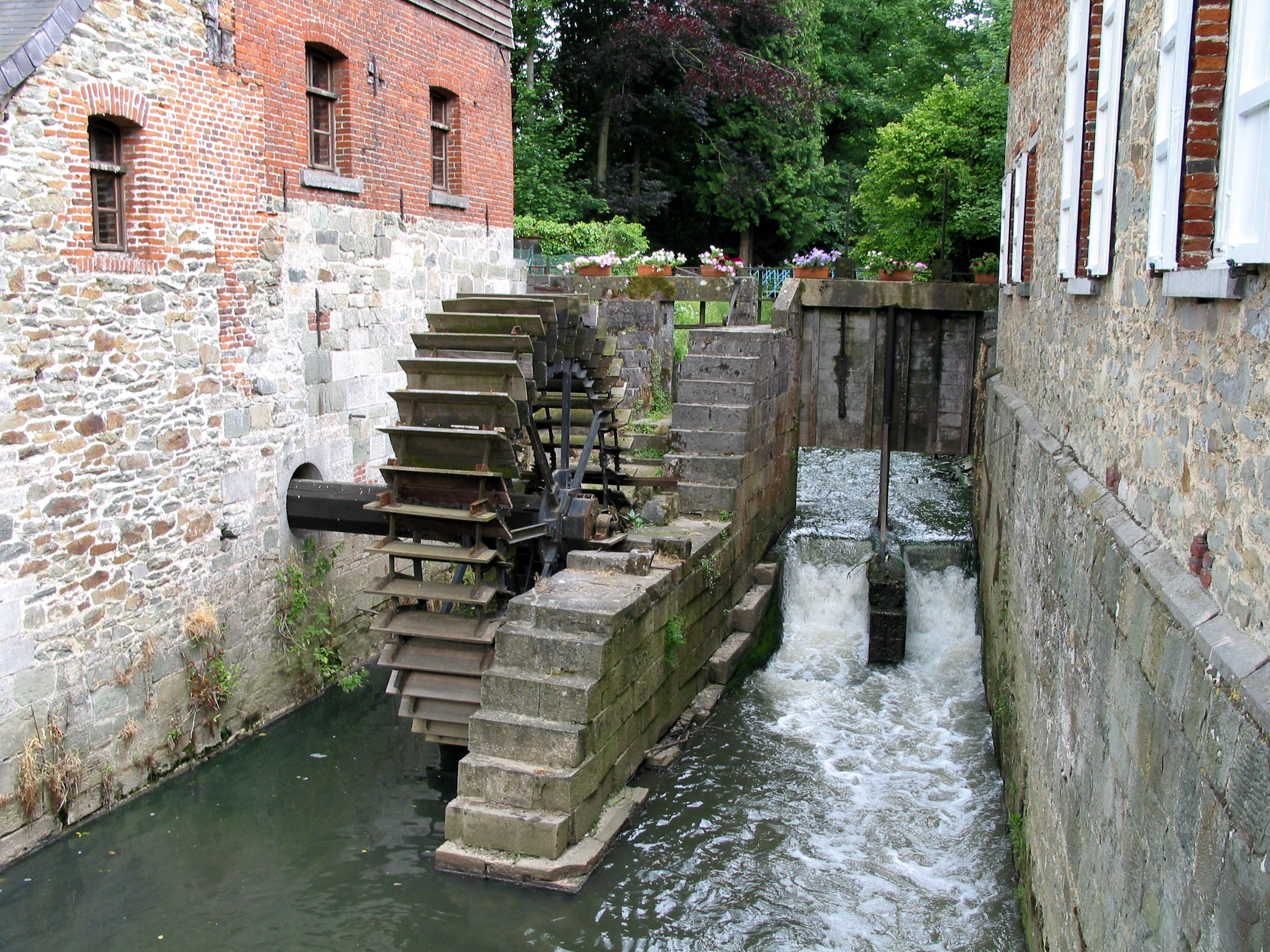
Watermill of Braine-le-Château, Belgium (12th century)

Manufacturers will commit to very conservative service life, usually 2 to 5 years for most commercial and consumer products (for example computer peripherals and components). However, for large and expensive durable goods, the items are not consumable, and service lives and maintenance activity will factor large in the service life. Again, an airliner might have a mission time of 11 hours, a predicted active MTBF of 10,000 hours without maintenance (or 15,000 hours with maintenance), reliability of .99999, and a service life of 40 years.

The most common model for item lifetime is the bathtub curve, a plot of the varying failure rate as a function of time. During early life, the bathtub shows increased failures, usually witnessed during product development. The middle portion of the bathtub, or 'useful life', is a slightly inclined, nearly constant failure rate period where the consumer enjoys the benefit conferred by the product. As time increases further, the curve reaches a period of increasing failures, modeling the product's wear-out phase.

For an individual product, the component parts may each have independent service lives, resulting in several bathtub curves. For instance, a tire will have a service life partitioning related to the tread and the casing.

== Examples ==
For maintainable items, those wear-out items that are determined by logistical analysis to be provisioned for sparing and replacement will assure a longer service life than manufactured items without such planning. A simple example is automotive tires - failure to plan for this wear out item would limit automotive service life to the extent of a single set of tires.

An individual tire's life follows the bathtub curve, to boot. After installation, there is a not-small probability of failure which may be related to material or workmanship or even to the process for mounting the tire which may introduce some small damage. After the initial period, the tire will perform, given no defect introducing events such as encountering a road hazard (a nail or a pothole), for a long duration relative to its expected service life which is a function of several variables (design, material, process). After a period, the failure probability will rise; for some tires, this will occur after the tread is worn out. Then, a secondary market for tires puts a retread on the tire thereby extending the service life. It is not uncommon for an 80,000-mile tire to perform well beyond that limit.

It may be difficult to obtain reliable longevity data about many consumer products as, in general, efforts at actuarial analysis are not taken to the same extent as found with that needed to support insurance decisions. However, some attempts to provide this type of information have been made. An example is the collection of estimates for household components provided by the Old House Web which gathers data from the Appliance Statistical Review and various institutes involved with the homebuilding trade.

Some Engine manufacturers, such as for example Navistar and Volvo, use a so-called B-life rating, based on the durability data of the engine manufacturer, B10 and B50 index for measuring the life expectancy of an engine.

When exposed to high temperatures, the lithium-ion batteries in smartphones are easily damaged and can fail faster than expected, in addition to letting the device run out of battery too often. Debris and other contaminants that enter through small cracks in the phone can also infringe on smartphone life expectancy. One of the most common factors that cause smartphones and other electronic devices to die quickly is physical impact and breakage, which can severely damage the internal pieces.

== Operational life ==
For certain products, such as those that cannot be serviced during their operational life for technical reasons, a manufacturer may calculate a product's expected performance at both the beginning of operational life (BOL) and end of operational life (EOL). Batteries and other components that degrade over time may affect the operation of a product. The performance of mission critical components is therefore calculated for EOL, with the components exceeding their specification at BOL. For example, with spaceflight hardware, which must survive in the harsh environment of space, the capacity to generate electricity from solar panels or radioisotope thermoelectric generator (RTG) is likely to reduce throughout a mission, but must still meet a specific requirement at EOL in order to complete the mission. A spacecraft may also have a BOL mass that is greater than its EOL mass as propellant is depleted during its operational life.

== See also ==
- Availability
- Capacity loss
- Decrepit car
- Design life
- Durability
- Maintainability
- Planned obsolescence
- Repairability
- Shelf life
- Throwaway society
- Whole-life cost
