= Maintainability =

Ease of maintaining a functioning product or service

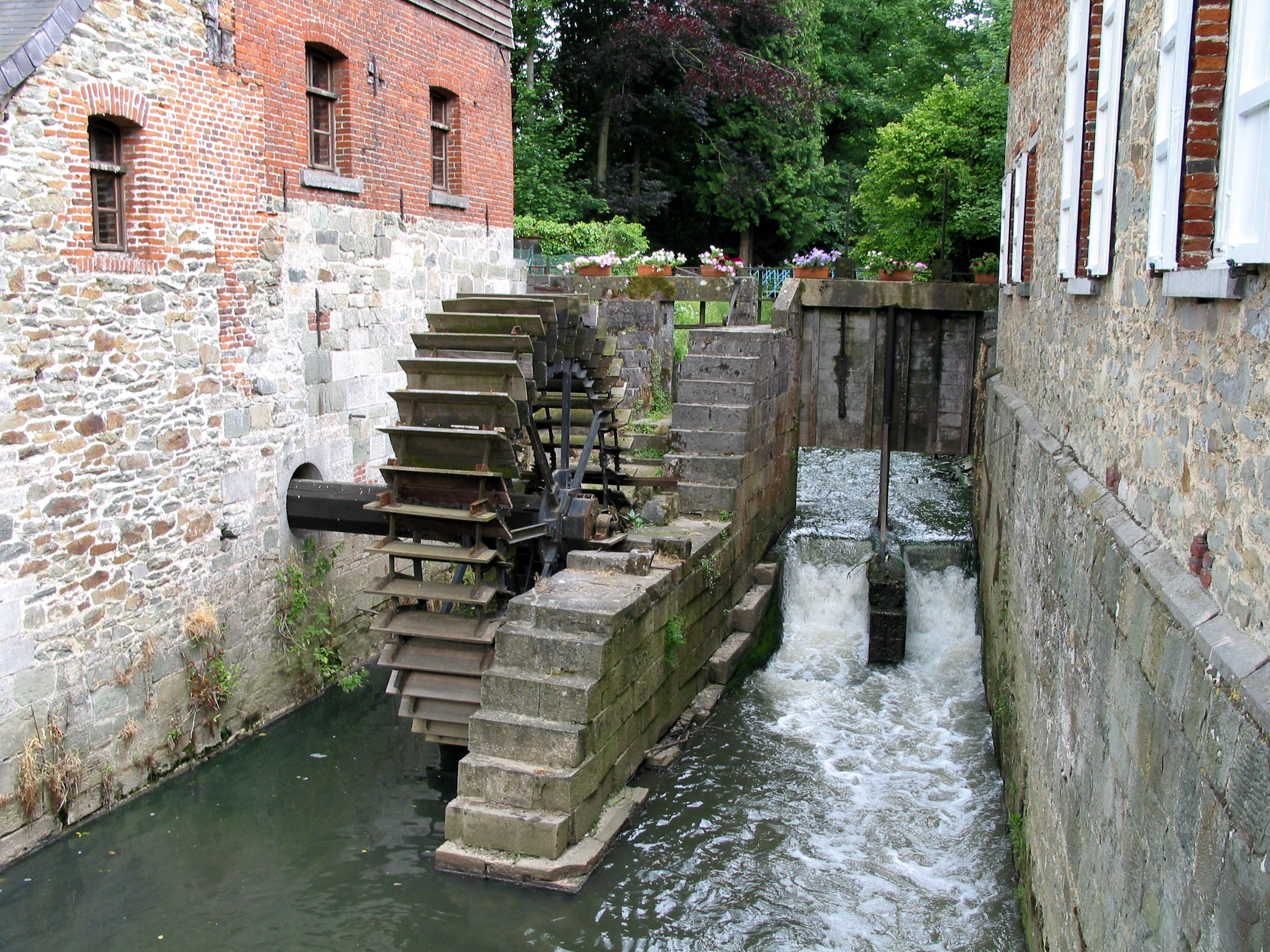
Watermill of Braine-le-Château, Belgium (12th century)

Maintainability is the inherent design characteristic of a system or product that determines the probability that it can be retained in, or restored to, a specified operating condition within a given time when maintenance is performed under prescribed conditions using specified procedures and resources.

== Usage in different fields ==
=== Engineering ===
In engineering, maintainability is the ease with which a product can be maintained to:

- correct defects or their cause,
- Repair or replace faulty or worn-out components without having to replace still working parts,
- prevent unexpected working conditions,
- maximize a product's useful life,
- maximize efficiency, reliability, and safety,
- meet new requirements,
- make future maintenance easier, or
- cope with a changing environment.

In some cases, maintainability involves a system of continuous improvement - learning from the past to improve the ability to maintain systems, or improve the reliability of systems based on maintenance experience.

=== Telecommunication ===
In telecommunications and several other engineering fields, the term maintainability has the following meanings:

- A characteristic of design and installation, expressed as the probability that an item will be retained in or restored to a specified condition within a given period of time, when the maintenance is performed by prescribed procedures and resources.
- The ease with which maintenance of a functional unit can be performed by prescribed requirements.

This article incorporates public domain material from Federal Standard 1037C. General Services Administration. Archived from the original on 2022-01-22. (in support of MIL-STD-188).

=== Software ===
In software engineering, these activities are known as software maintenance (cf. ISO/IEC 25010). Closely related concepts in the software engineering domain are evolvability, modifiability, technical debt, and code smells.

== See also ==
- List of system quality attributes, non-functional requirements for system evaluation
- Maintenance (technical), measures to preserve or restore the functionality or lifespan of equipment and infrastructure
- Supportability (disambiguation)
- Serviceability (disambiguation)
- Software sizing, activity in software development to estimate the size of a component, such as the number of lines of code or functions (not taking into account the effort required)
- Reliability, availability, maintainability and safety, characterization of a product or system
- Throw-away society, human society strongly influenced by consumerism
