= Car costs =

Costs of owning and operating a car

Mean monthly cost of an automobile in the United States, according to a 2016 poll. The American Automobile Association estimates the monthly cost of a sedan as US$725 as of 2015.

A car's internal costs are all the costs consumers pay to own and operate a car. Normally these expenditures are divided into fixed or standing costs and variable or running costs. Fixed costs are those which do not depend on the distance traveled by the vehicle and which the owner must pay to keep the vehicle ready for use on the road, like insurance or road taxes. Variable or running costs are those that depend on the use of the car, like fuel or tolls.

Compared to other popular modes of passenger transportation, especially buses or trains, the car has a relatively high cost per passenger-distance traveled. For the average car owner, depreciation constitutes about half the cost of running a car. The typical motorist underestimates this fixed cost by a significant margin.

The IRS considers that the average US automobile has a total cost of US$0.58/mile, around €0.32/km. According to the American Automobile Association, the average driver of the average sedan spends totally approximately US$8,700 per year, or US$720 per month, to own and operate their vehicle.

== Fixed costs ==
=== Car acquisition ===
US vehicle purchase prices surged during the COVID-19 pandemic, but then stabilized somewhat.

The car itself has a cost. The cost can be reduced by buying a reused car. But the reused car may have hidden defects, hidden problems, or be about to be out of norms. It is the most shallow and most immediate cost. But it can be delayed under a loan scheme.

==== Loan costs ====
Car finance comprises the different financial products which allows someone to acquire a car with any arrangement other than a single lump payment. When used, and for the purpose of assessing the private financial costs, one must consider only the interests paid by the car owner, as some part of the amount the owner pays each month for the finance is already embedded in the depreciations costs.

=== Depreciation ===
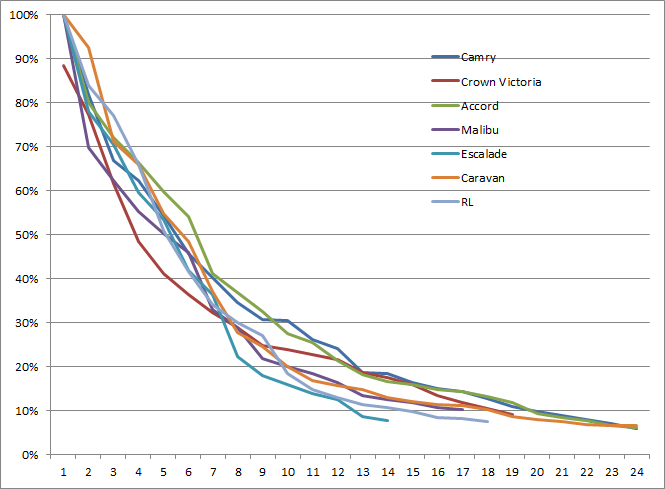
Normalized car depreciation for several models obtained from online retailer from US

The yearly depreciation of a car is the amount its value decreases every year. Normally a car's value is correlated with the price it has on the market, but on average a car has a depreciation around 15–20% per year. Depending on market conditions, cars may depreciate 10–30% the first year. Since 2021, however, cars have appreciated significantly the first year due to shortages of cars and up to five-year wait times for new cars.

=== Car taxes ===
Car taxes, road taxes, vehicle taxes or Vehicle Excise Duty are the amount of money car owners pay the government to allow the car to operate within that region or state. These taxes serve to maintain the road infrastructure or to compensate the negative externalities caused by the motor vehicles. These taxes may depend on engine displacement, vehicle weight, miles traveled, CO_{2} emissions, or the car value.

=== Insurance ===
Insurance serves to provide financial protection against physical damage and/or bodily injury resulting from traffic collisions and against liability that could also arise there-from.

=== Inspection ===
Vehicle inspection is a procedure mandated by law in which a vehicle is inspected to ensure that it conforms to regulations governing safety, emissions, or both.

=== Driving license ===
A driving license is often required to drive a car.

=== Cost of capital ===
The cost of capital, applied to a purchase of a car, is the amount of money the car owner could have obtained, if they, instead of buying the car, applied that amount of money to other worthy investment. The cost of capital is the rate of return that capital could be expected to earn in an alternative investment of equivalent risk. Considering by default the car has depreciation, and that such depreciation is already considered at a certain cost item, the cost of capital of owning a car, is then the income that the car owner could have obtained with the money spent on such car. One example could be a common standard interest rate in a deposit account.

== Running costs ==
=== Fuel ===
The fuel costs depend basically on four factors, namely the distance travelled by the car, the price paid for the fuel, the energy efficiency of the car and the type of driving. In Western countries, this cost normally is the second highest after depreciation.

=== Maintenance ===
The maintenance of a car can have the purpose to be a long term or a short term maintenance. This cost might be very irregular and somewhat unpredictable but tends to increase with the age of the car. On this item are included car parts that need to be replaced after a certain period of time (for example every two years) or with a specific number of travelled kilometres or miles, like tires or filters.

=== Repairs and improvements ===
Repairs costs are completely unpredictable because they depend on the number and severity of car collisions, like dents repairing for example. These costs also refer to spare parts substitution due to malfunctioning. On this cost item it might be included also the parts bought to improve the performance or the aesthetic of the vehicle.

=== Parking ===
The costs of parking include all the money the user needs to pay to park their car. This applies normally to car parking lots, like in offices, public buildings, shopping centres or in the downtown; but also on the public space (normally in the inner part of some city) using parking meters. This cost might be relatively predictable, if the user for example has a monthly contract with some parking lot company, or if they rent a private parking space.

=== Tolls ===
A toll road, also known as a turnpike or tollway, is a public or private roadway for which a fee (or toll) is assessed for passage. Normally this applies to motorways, bridges and tunnels but it might also apply, like in some cities such as London or Stockholm, to gain access to the city-centre. This cost might be predictable if the user passes the tolled roadway, a defined number of times per month.

=== Fines ===
A traffic fine or traffic ticket is a notice issued by a law enforcement official to a motorist accusing violation of traffic laws. Traffic tickets generally come in two forms, citing a moving violation, such as exceeding the speed limit, or a non-moving violation, such as a parking violation. These tickets almost always imply the payment of a certain quantity of money.

=== Car washes ===
The cost of car wash varies according to the frequency users clean their car, and with the price of each cleaning. In many countries in Europe, cleaning a car in a driveway may be Illegal.

== See also ==
- Economics of car use
- Societal effects of cars
- Externalities of cars
- Personal finance
