= Serviceability (banking) =

Australian banking term for a debtor's ability to meet loan repayments

Serviceability in Australian banking is the ability of a debtor to meet loan repayments. In the 1990s debt serviceability criteria had been relaxed, but nowadays it's harder to get finance. Every creditor has own serviceability model.

== The essence ==
Under the Consumer Credit Code, before creditors can approve borrower's application, they must carry out an assessment of his ability to service any loan without financial hardship. Creditors refusing to extend loans to people whose repayments exceeding ⅓ of their gross income (such persons are considered to be "mortgage stressed").

== Calculation ==
Lenders establish the maximum amount of debt that borrower can afford to take on given his current income by applying a debt-to-income ratio. Every creditor sets his own ratio, however, most lenders set a maximum debt service ratio of between 30 and 35%. Also, some creditors apply number of measures to "protect" borrower from any changing circumstances (interest rate rises, income reduction etc).

=== Income ===
In some industries (police, fire services and nursing, for example), overtime is an integral part of income and is considered for serviceability criteria. But for other professions, a reduced proportion of overtime income is used. In which case, the creditor will only apply a reduced amount of the borrower's overtime in calculating serviceability.

The income from a second job is considered if the job has been held continuously for at least one year.

When calculating serviceability, creditors consider rental income from investment properties. But a lot of banks will only use 75% of rental income.

=== Liabilities ===
Existing or potential debt reduces the amount for a new loan. In the case of credit cards, most creditors set a minimum repayment obligation of 2.5 – 3.0% of the approved credit limit. So, usually, creditors require account statements to confirm monthly repayments.

=== Other factors ===
Some creditors not consider property investors' tax benefits they receive if their loan is negatively geared.

Creditors add a margin (today is around 2,5% and more) to the variable rate, to arrive the "assessment rate", when calculating repayments for a new loan. This means that creditors want to know whether borrower would be able to repay his debts if interest rates reach 7.5% and higher.
