= Maintenance-free operating period =

Operating time measurement

Maintenance-free operating period (MFOP) is an alternative measure of performance to the mean time between failures (MTBF), defined as the time period during which a device will be able to perform each of its intended functions, requiring only a minimal degree of maintenance. It was originally proposed in 1996 by the United Kingdom's Ministry of Defence, with intended application to military aircraft.

== See also ==
- Service life
- Time between overhauls
