= Serviceability =

Serviceability may refer to:

- Serviceability (structure)
- Serviceability (computer)
- Serviceability (banking)
