= Car longevity =

Measure of service life of automobiles

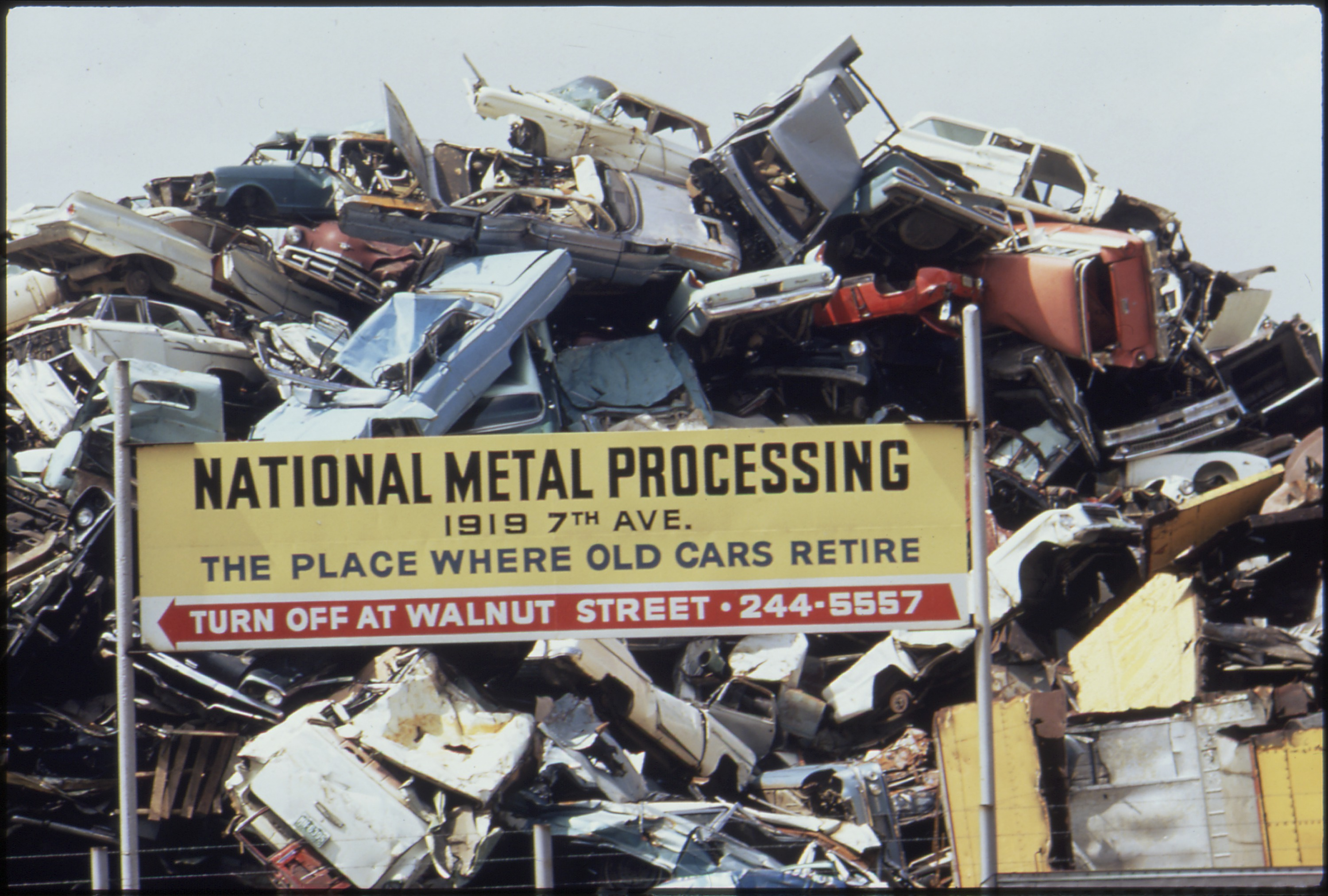

Car longevity refers to an automobile's maximum service life in either mileage or time (duration). It includes the relationship of components to this lifespan and the identification of factors that might afford control in extending the lifespan. Barring a severe accident, a car would have a service life constrained by the earliest part to fail. Longevity is of interest to many car owners.

== Background ==
An automobile is a highly engineered collection of complex components, each of which has its own lifespan and longevity characteristics. The MTBF (mean time between failures) of some components is expected to be smaller than the life of the car, as the replacement of these is considered part of regular maintenance. Other components, which typically experience less wear, are expected to have a longer life; however, a large longevity may very well require replacement of several of these, raising issues of economics. If all components are repairable, then there is no upper limit to the vehicle's longevity if, as with the Ship of Theseus, we believe it still the same vehicle after it has none of its original parts.

The motivation for pursuing longevity can vary. The economic trade-off of the remaining value versus repair cost is usually considered when deciding to repair or discard. Other factors, such as emotional attachment or a desire to reduce waste, may also be involved. Some of these factors were explored for the horse-drawn carriage in the 19th Century poem "The Deacon's Masterpiece"

The life of the auto, as the collection, follows, according to a very common model, a bathtub-like pattern: after an initial phase, where components may fail because of design and manufacturing defects, there is typically a long period of few failures, followed by an increase as components wear out. The maximum lifespan for any car, and its future value (including possibly as a "classic" collectible), cannot be known when the car is purchased. Research into the longevity of vehicles will improve the ability to predict car life, with such things as a life table for cars.

== Statistics ==
In the United States, the Environmental Protection Agency assumes the typical car is driven 15,000 miles (24,000 km) per year. According to the New York Times, in the 1960s and 1970s, the typical car reached its end of life around 100,000 miles (160,000 km). Due in part to manufacturing improvements, such as tighter tolerances and better anti-corrosion coatings, in 2012 the typical car was estimated to last for 200,000 miles (320,000 km) with the average car in 2024 lasting 160,545 miles according to the website Junk Car Reaper.

According to a recent study by Junk Car Medics the average vehicle in the USA last 16.58 years and 156,470 miles.

== Predictions from futurists ==
For decades, many pundits, bloggers, market analysts, and promoters of products and services with claims to extend the lifetime of an automobile, have pointed to various technological possibilities and to economic trends, which could either lead to "disposable" cars, or cars that last significantly longer than today.

For example, in 2023 a futurist predicted that by 2030, "... electric vehicles will do around 500,000 miles (800,000 km) compared to ICE vehicles that get around 140,000 miles (225,000 km) over their lifetime... And soon enough you’re gonna see million mile EVs. And what that means is that over 10 years you’re going to need just one EV for 10 petrol cars... The day that we get level four, autonomous technology ready and approved by regulators, when that converges with on-demand, and electric transportation we will get what we call transportation as a service (TAAS)... So for most people who can barely pay their bills, it won’t make any sense to own a car."

In 2016, a blogger for the "Collision Industry" (a.k.a. autobody repair shops and services) in the US reviewed the then-current status and future prospects of the "disposable car" concept:

... will disposable cars ever be a reality that we can all latch onto? No one is certain, but futurists are telling us what we already know — car personal ownership makes no sense at least financially. Once, consumers will accept this hard fact, maybe the demand for disposable cars will grow and we'll find more of them on the roads of the United States and beyond.

== Notable examples of high mileage ==
Some car manufacturers support a "high mileage" club. For example, Volvo and Mercedes-Benz have a "High Mileage Award" program in which owners who drive 250,000 kilometres (160,000 mi), 500,000 kilometres (310,000 mi), 750,000 kilometres (470,000 mi), and 1,000,000 kilometres (620,000 mi) are awarded with a certificate and a radiator grille badge.

Many non-commercial vehicles (both auto and truck) have exceeded 1,000,000 miles (1,600,000 km). For instance, in 2013, East Patchogue, New York resident Irv Gordon (1940-2018) had accumulated 3,000,000 miles (4,800,000 km) in his 1966 Volvo P1800. The car had amassed 3,200,000 miles (5,100,000 km) by Gordon's death on 15 November 2018.

In 2006, a 1995 Dodge Ram was reported to Chrysler as having gone 1,000,000 miles (1,600,000 km).

A 1976 Mercedes-Benz 240D in Greece belonging to Gregorios Sachinidis had reached 2,858,307 miles (4,599,999 km) before retiring to the Mercedes-Benz Museum in Germany.

A 1989 Saab 900 SPG belonging to Peter Gilbert of Wisconsin had put in 1,001,385 miles (1,611,573 km) before it was donated to the Wisconsin Automotive Museum.

Another was the 1963 Volkswagen Beetle belonging to Albert Klein of Pasadena, California that had accumulated 1,442,044 miles (2,320,745 km) on 25 January 1993.

AARP Magazine featured several long-running cars over 200,000 miles (320,000 km) in its July 2009 issue.

A 2014 study on Consumer Reports by iSeeCars.com listed 10 Longest Lasting Cars over 200,000 miles (320,000 km).

In mid-2022, a Tesla S passed the million-mile mark; and in March 2023 its owner was hoping to soon pass 2 million kilometers (1.25 million miles). The maintenance costs have been high: at least one battery replacement and eight electric motor replacements.

== See also ==
- Reliability engineering
- Economics of automobile ownership
- Scrappage program
- Sustainable transport
- Vehicular metrics
