= Account stated =

Under United States law, account stated is a statement between a creditor (the person to whom money is owed) and a debtor (the person who owes) based upon a series of prior transactions that a particular amount is owed to the creditor as of a certain date. Often the account stated is a bill, invoice or a summary of invoices, signed by the customer or sent to the customer who pays part or all of it without protest.

An account stated may also be established when the debtor retains the statement of account (for example the bill or invoice) without objecting, for a reasonable length of time. "Reasonable" is determined by looking at the surrounding circumstances. An account stated is in the nature of a kind of settlement between the parties, such as when a person receives a bank statement, is capable and even obligated to check the math within a specified period of time, otherwise the account as between the parties is thus "stated." The key element is either the express agreement or an agreement implied by law under all the facts and circumstances.

== Purpose ==
Arthur Corbin's influential treatise on Contracts explains the purpose and historic context of "account stated" as follows:

Persons who carry on business with each other often have a series of transactions constituting an open running account with various items of debit and credit. For long periods neither one may know which one is actually indebted to the other. Under such circumstances, they may get together and compare their books and their memories, cast up their mutual accounts, and strike a balance. In Latin phrase, they were formerly said to have accounted together—insimul computassent. Assumpsit lay for the recovery of the balance so found due, before the development of many of the principles of present-day contract law. Common illustrations of such accounts, with recurring debits and credits, are those between banker and depositor, between customer and grocer or department store, between principal and agent, and between partners in business. In all such cases, if the items are liquidated in money, one of the parties is a debtor to the other in an amount that can be determined at any time by an accounting process. The amount of the debt is the balance of debits over credits. The debt becomes due and payable only as the parties may have agreed; this may be in installments or as a whole, at regular intervals or as demanded by the presentation of drafts or statements of account."

== Elements ==
The elements of account stated are: (1) prior transactions between the parties which establish a debtor-creditor relationship; (2)an express or implied agreement between the parties as to the amount due; and (3) an express or implied promise from the debtor to pay the amount due. When a creditor sues for account stated, this sets both the debtor's liability and the exact amount the debtor must pay, which on its surface is less complicated than claiming a debt is due and payable. An account stated may carry a longer statute of limitations (time to file suit) than some other forms of debt, depending on the state.

In other states, such as Washington state, "account stated" is generally asserted as a defense in a contract action. Courts in those states characterize "account stated" as being merely a defense or a "doctrine" that prevents parties from raising issues that have already been dealt with, compromised and/or settled by the parties.

“An account stated has been defined as an agreement between parties who have had previous transactions that the account representing those transactions is true and that the balance stated is correct, together with a promise, express or implied, for the payment of such balance." "An account stated is merely a form of proving damages for the breach of a promise to pay on a contract."

== Reasons for litigation ==
Nevertheless, even where account stated is recognized as a cause of action in and of itself, defenses such as fraud or mistake may still be asserted to the "account stated," as with any settlement of parties to complex transactions. In situations where no account has been proven as stated, or where the existence of an agreement between the parties on a particular amount as being correct is effectively denied, all of the defenses or counterclaims that may exist with respect to the underlying transaction are preserved, and therefore may still be litigated.

Both the basic agreement and rendition of account must be proved. “[T]he rule that an account rendered and not objected to within a reasonable time is to be regarded as correct assumes that there was an original indebtedness, but there can be no liability on an account stated if no liability in fact exists, and the mere presentation of a claim, although not objected to, cannot of itself create liability. . . . In other words, an account stated cannot create original liability where none exists; it is merely a final determination of the amount of an existing debt.”

Significant litigation occurs on "account stated" issues where professional legal or medical services are involved, and the recipient of the services happens not to object in writing to bills allegedly sent and received. Professional services are required to be "reasonable and necessary" in amount by both law and ethical rules, yet these professional creditors often assert that non-objection constitutes agreement to whatever figure was billed. Especially where legal or medical relations are or may be ongoing, arguing that silence constitutes agreement to what might otherwise be an overcharge can be hotly contested by parties. At least in the case of attorney fees, voluminous litigation exists regarding what's reasonable and necessary given the professional services rendered in a particular context, and accounts are rarely "stated" in professional services cases absent facts such as where there has been payment by the alleged debtor without objection, or a final and unappealed court order for the payment of those professional fees.
