= Supportability =

Supportability may refer to:

- Supportability (engineering)
  - Supportability (computer science)
