= Tritan copolyester =

Brand of copolymer

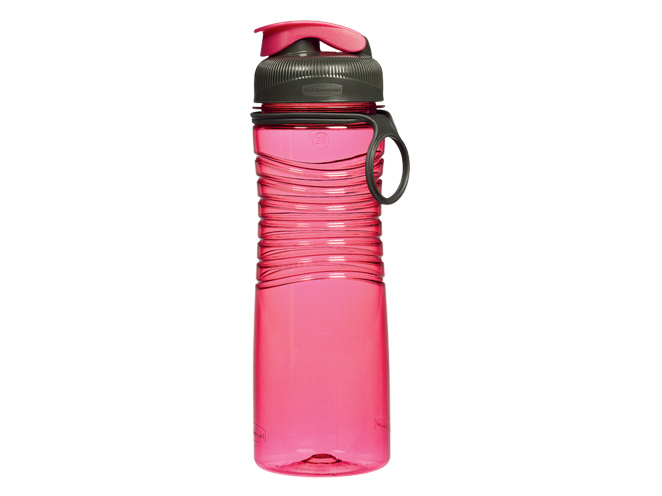
A water bottle made of Tritan.

Tritan, a copolymer offered by the Eastman Chemical Company since 2007, is a transparent plastic intended to replace polycarbonate, because of health concerns about Bisphenol A (BPA). Tritan is a copolymer made from three monomers: dimethyl terephthalate (DMT), cyclohexanedimethanol (CHDM), and 2,2,4,4-Tetramethyl-1,3-cyclobutanediol (CBDO). Tritan or Poly Cyclohexylenedimethylene Terephthalate Glyco (PCTG) is made without using any bisphenols or phthalate plasticizers.

Compared to similar resins, Eastman says Tritan has improved resistance to heat and chemicals, with less degradation in conditions such as dishwashing, microwaving, and when used with hot beverages.

In April 2008, Nalgene announced it would phase out production of its outdoor line of polycarbonate containers containing the chemical bisphenol A. Nalgene now uses Tritan as a replacement for polycarbonate, as it does not contain BPA.

== Toxicology & Health controversy ==
In 2011, a neurobiologist at the University of Texas at Austin, George Bittner, published an article claiming that most polymers, including Tritan, contained other materials with estrogenic activity. Bittner published the article eleven years after he founded the company PlastiPure to develop safer plastics.

After these claims were repeated by Bittner's company PlastiPure, Tritan's inventor, the Eastman Chemical Company, sued PlastiPure. A jury ruled in Eastman's favor, and the Court barred PlastiPure from making claims about Tritan's estrogenic activity. In expert testimony, Wade Welshon of the University of Missouri-Columbia, agreed that the Tritan copolymer is likely not estrogenic, but that the estrogenic activity he found in five separate tests of Tritan products could be attributable to other chemicals added during manufacturing.

During the trial it emerged that Thomas Osimitz — who authored the journal article that had initially cleared Tritan of estrogenic activity — was paid $10,000 by the company for the paper, which was not disclosed in the Conflict of Interests section. Osimitz was questioned about this by Reuters, stating that the disclosure forms were "very confusing." Bittner maintains that his assays are more sensitive than the ones performed by Osimitz et al.

Since then, other work has shown that like other polymers, certain additives or impurities present in Tritan can migrate from the plastic into water held in a container made of the material. Among these are 2-phenoxyethanol (CAS 122-99-6 ), dimethyl isophtalate (CAS 1459-93-4 ), 4-nonylphenol (CAS 104-40-5 ), bisphenol A (CAS 80-05-7 ) and butyl benzyl pthalate (CAS 85-68-7 ). However, these were found in concentrations well below levels permissible by European Union regulations.

== Similar products ==
Other manufacturers have developed similar products including the French Arc Holdings's Kwarx since 2006, the German Glaskoch (Leonardo) Teqton since 2009 and the South-Korean SK Chemicals' Ecozen, a glycol-modified polyethylene terephthalate (PETG) since 2010/2011. Other manufacturers propose polypropylene (PP) or methylstyrene (MS) as alternatives to Tritan.

== Name confusion ==
Tritan can also refer to a type of so called unbreakable glass originally developed by the German Zwiesel Kristallglas in 2002 together with University of Erlangen–Nuremberg. Its name is derived from titanoxide (titanium oxide in English). In 2012, the Zwiesel Kristallglas company introduced Tritan Protect. Confusingly, although both are unrelated, Zwiesel Tritan glass and Eastman Tritan copolyester are both advertised as "shatter protected" and are used in the production of drinking glasses as replacements for traditional glasses, despite their different material properties.

== See also ==
- Superfest (a chemically hardened glass also known as Ceverit or CV-Glas)
- Gorilla Glass
- Borosilicate glass (a type of heat-resistant glass)
- Microplastics
