= Tritan =

Tritan may refer to:

- Tritan (plastic), a tradename for a transparent glass-like copolyester by Eastman Chemicals (since 2007)
- Tritan (glass), a tradename for a transparent glass by Schott Zwiesel (since 2002)
- Triphenylmethane, an old name for the organic colorless solid compound
- A type of blue-yellow color blindness, comprising tritanomaly and tritanopia
- Tritan Shehu (born 1954), Albanian politician
- A fictional robot in the Tobot animated series

== See also ==
- Tristan (disambiguation)
- Triton (disambiguation)
