= Unbreakable glass =

Glass or glass substitute

Unbreakable glass is glass, or glass substitute, which does not display the normal fragility of glass – in general the term is not used to refer to something that is absolutely unbreakable.

== In historical fiction ==
In Satyricon, a work of satirical fiction by Petronius (c. 27 AD – c. 66 AD), an inventor brought a drinking bowl to the Roman emperor Tiberius made of vitrum flexile – translated as either flexible or unbreakable glass – which did not shatter but merely dented. Tiberius asked if anyone else is aware of the invention. When the inventor replied that he was the only person who knew the secret, Tiberius had him killed, in order to protect the livelihood of the glassmakers.

== See also ==
- Flexible glass
- Toughened glass
- Bulletproof glass
- Safety glass
- Laminated glass
- Acrylic glass (by various trade names like Crylux, Hesalite, Plexiglas, Acrylite, Lucite, Perspex, etc.)
- Gorilla Glass
- Transparent Armor Gun Shield
- Superfest (a chemically hardened glass also known as Ceverit and CV-Glas)
- Kwarx
- Tritan (glass)
- Tritan (plastic)
- Teqton
- Ecozen
