= Cost model =

Cost model may refer to

- Cost model (computer science): A model used in the analysis of algorithms to define what constitutes a single step in the execution of an algorithm.
- Whole-life cost, the total cost of ownership over the life of an asset. Also known as Life-cycle cost (LCC).
