= Green furniture =

Green furniture, often symbolized by a tree, are products that use materials from sustainable forests, that have low toxic material levels, are locally manufactured, and durable enough to last.
