= Strength of glass =

Physical properties of glass

Glass typically has a tensile strength of 7 megapascals (1,000 psi). However, the theoretical upper bound on its strength is orders of magnitude higher: 17 gigapascals (2,500,000 psi). This high value is due to the strong chemical Si–O bonds of silicon dioxide. Imperfections of the glass, such as bubbles, and in particular surface flaws, such as scratches, have a great effect on the strength of glass and decrease it even more than for other brittle materials. The chemical composition of the glass also impacts its tensile strength. The processes of thermal and chemical toughening can increase the tensile strength of glass.

Glass has a compressive strength of 1,000 megapascals (150,000 psi).

== Strength of glass fiber ==
Glass fibers have a much higher tensile strength than regular glass (200-500 times stronger than regular glass). This is due to the reduction of flaws in glass fibers and the small cross sectional area of glass fibers, constraining maximum defect size.

== Strength of fiberglass ==
Fiberglass's strength depends on the type. S-glass has a strength of 700,000 pounds per square inch (4,800 MPa) while E-glass and C-glass have a strength of 500,000 pounds per square inch (3,400 MPa).

== Hardness ==
Glass has a hardness of 6.5 on the Mohs scale of mineral hardness.
