= Product stewardship =

Managing the environmental impact of different products and materials

Product stewardship is an approach to managing the environmental impacts of different products and materials and at different stages in their production, use and disposal. It acknowledges that those involved in producing, purchasing, selling, using and disposing of products have a shared responsibility to ensure that those products or materials are managed in a way that reduces their impact, throughout their lifecycle, on the environment and on human health and safety. This approach focuses on the product itself, and everyone involved in the lifespan of the product is called upon to take up responsibility to reduce its environmental, health, and safety impacts.

For manufacturers, this responsibility includes planning for, and if necessary, paying for the recycling or disposal of the product at the end of its useful life. This may be achieved, in part, by redesigning products to use fewer harmful substances, to be more durable, reusable and recyclable, and by making products from recycled materials. For retailers and consumers, this means taking an active role in ensuring the proper disposal or recycling of an end-of-life product.

Those who advocate it are concerned with the later phases of product lifecycle and the comprehensive outcome of the whole production process. It is considered a pre-requisite to a strict service economy interpretation of (fictional, national, legal) "commodity" and "product" relationships.

The term product stewardship is often used interchangeably with extended producer responsibility, a similar concept. However, there are distinct differences between the two, as suggested by the semantics of the different terms used. While both concepts bring the onus of waste management for end-of-life products from the government to the manufacturers, Product stewardship further extends this responsibility to everyone involved in the life-cycle of the product: not only manufacturers, but also retailers, consumers and recyclers.

== Examples ==
One familiar example is the container-deposit legislation. A fee is paid to buy the bottle, separately from the fee to buy what it contains. If the bottle is returned, the fee is returned, and the supplier must return the bottle for re-use or recycling. If not, the collected fee can be used to pay for landfill or litter control measures. Also, since the same fee can be collected by anyone finding and returning the bottle, it is common for people to collect these and return them as a means of surviving: this is quite common, for instance, among homeless people in U.S. cities.

However, the principle is applied very broadly beyond bottles to paint and automobile parts such as tires. When purchasing paint or tires in many places, one simultaneously pays for the disposal of the toxic waste they become.

The demand-side approach ethical consumerism, supported by consumer education and information about environmental impacts, may approach some of the same outcomes as product stewardship.

The American Irish-registered pharmaceutical company Perrigo has linked product stewardship and sustainability in the role of a senior manager in order to integrate its company overview of sustainability issues. The company has noted that responding to the adoption of EU REACH restrictions on the use of per- and polyfluoroalkyl substances following new legislation in this field will require this type of overview and "singular vision".

== Legislation ==
In some countries, such as Germany, the law requires attention to the comprehensive outcome of the whole extraction, production, distribution, use and waste of a product, and holds those profiting from these legally responsible for any outcome along the way. This is also the trend in the UK and EU generally. In the United States, the issue has been confronted via class action lawsuits that attempt to hold companies liable for the environmental impact of their products. Thus far, such as litigation or proposed accounting reforms such as full cost accounting have not gained much traction for the product stewardship concept in the United States beyond the realm of academia and corporate public relations (derisively referred to as greenwashing).

Australia's Product Stewardship Act 2011 provides a framework for managing the environmental, health and safety impacts of products, and in particular those impacts associated with the disposal of products and their associated waste. The framework includes voluntary, co-regulatory and mandatory product stewardship. The passage of the legislation is said to have delivered on a key commitment by the Australian Government under the National Waste Policy, which was agreed by Australian state governments in November 2009 and endorsed by the Council of Australian Governments in October 2010.

The Act supports the National Television and Computer Recycling Scheme (NTCRS) through the Product Stewardship (Televisions and Computers) Regulations 2011. The scheme has recycled approximately 230,000 tonnes of electronic waste since its inception. This review is an important opportunity to continue to update and improve the NTCRS.

The Minister’s Product List is established by the Act, and is updated annually. The list informs the community and industry of those products being considered for accreditation or regulation under the Act.

A review of the Act was mandated to take place five years after implementation, and this was initiated in March 2018.

== Product stewardship professionals ==
Product stewardship professionals can seek certification as a Certified Professional Product Steward (CPPS) from the Board for Global EHS Credentialing. The CPPS is the first credential of its kind, allowing product stewards with the opportunity to distinguish their expertise and build professional credibility within the field.

== See also ==
- Conservation and restoration of cultural property
- Durability
- Durable good
- Extended producer responsibility
- Maintainability
- Recycling
- Sustainability
