= List of lost inventions =

Technologies whose capabilities can no longer be produced in their original form

This is a list of lost inventions - technologies whose capabilities can no longer be produced in their original form. It does not include theoretical inventions.

== Certain lost inventions ==
- Artificial petrifaction of human cadavers invented by Girolamo Segato.
- The Electronium, an early synthesizer capable of algorithmic composition.
- Greek fire, a Byzantine incendiary weapon used to set enemy ships on fire.
- Panjagan, a projectile weapon or archery technique used by the late Sasanian military that could shoot a volley of five arrows.

== Questionable examples ==
It is unknown whether these inventions truly existed, had all of their described properties, or were truly novel.

- Archimedes' heat ray, a device that Archimedes is purported to have used to burn attacking Roman ships during the siege of Syracuse.
- Claw of Archimedes, purportedly a sort of crane used to drop an attacking Roman ship partly down in to the water during the siege of Syracuse.
- Polybolos, an ancient Greek repeating ballista. A MythBusters episode built and tested a replica, concluding that it plausibly could have existed. However, the replica machine was prone to breakdowns.
- Roman flexible glass, whose inventor was reportedly beheaded so that gold and silver would not be devalued.
- Mithridate, said to have functioned as a panaceaic antidote.
- Sloot Digital Coding System, reported to have been able to store a complete digital movie file in 8 kilobytes of data.
- Stradivarius stringed instruments, considered some of the finest instruments ever made. Theories explaining their purported quality include denser wood unique to the time period due to solar activity, treatment with other materials like calcium and aluminum which have been found in a 2016 shaving, and technique. However, blind experiments have never conclusively found a difference between the sound of Stradivari's violins and other high-quality violins.
- Starlite is an intumescent material claimed to be able to withstand enormous amounts of heat.
- Zhang's seismoscope, also known as hòufēng dìdòngyí, an ancient Chinese seismometer. Multiple modern recreations have been created, but it is debated whether they are mechanical replicas. Hong-sen Yan claims that they do not reach the seismoscope's historically reported level of accuracy and range.

== Misconceptions ==
These technologies can be recreated, but are sometimes claimed to be lost.

- The Blaschkas' Glass Flowers and glass sea creatures at Harvard are attributed to the extraordinary skill of the craftsmen.
- Damascus steel was valued for its hardness and technique of creation, but has been supplanted by modern methods. Similar modern processes have also been devised.
- The Iron pillar of Delhi, notable for the rust-resistant composition of the metals used in its construction.

== See also ==
- Out-of-place artifact
- Timeline of historic inventions
