= Flexible glass =

Alleged lost invention

Flexible glass is an alleged lost invention from the time of the reign of Tiberius Caesar. The story is presumed apocryphal.

== Mythology ==
According to Petronius (c. 27 AD – c. 66 AD) in his work Satyricon, the inventor of flexible glass (vitrum flexile) brought a drinking bowl made of the material before Tiberius Caesar. The bowl was put through a test to break it, but it merely dented, rather than shattering. The inventor repaired the bowl very easily with a small hammer, which he pulled from a pocket in his toga. After the inventor swore that he was the only man alive who knew the manufacturing technique, Tiberius had the man beheaded. It has been suggested this was either to protect the existing glassmaking industry, to ensure that glass remained breakable as an effective planned obsolescence or because he feared that the glass would devalue gold and silver, since the material might be more valuable.

Pliny the Elder (c. 23 AD – c. 79 AD) also included the story about the flexible glass in his encyclopedic work Naturalis Historia (XXXVI.66.195), but added that the story is "more widely spread than well authenticated".

Later during the Early Middle Ages, the story was retold by Isidore of Seville (c. 560 AD – c. 636 AD) in Etymologiae (XVI.16.6), De vitro, which in turn is included in pseudo-Heraclius's 13th-century collection of technical recipes.

Although these stories are commonly assumed to be either false or exaggerated, the historian Robert Jacobus Forbes believed that flexile referred to "bent" glass, such as handles used in stoneware.

== See also ==
- Unbreakable glass
- Roman concrete
- Greek fire
