= Product lifetime =

Length of time a product is owned and used

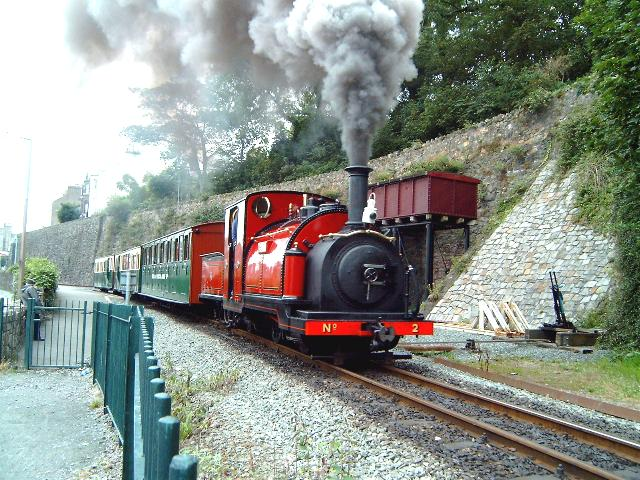
Prince railway was built 1863 and operated 1864–1936, 1955–1968, 1980-present, a product life of over 150 years, a service life of around 125 years

Product lifetime or product lifespan is the time interval from when a product is sold to when it is discarded.

Product lifetime is slightly different from service life because the latter considers only the effective time the product is used. It is also different from product economic life which refers to the point where maintaining a product is more expensive than replacing it; from product technical life which refers to the maximum period during which a product has the physical capacity to function; and from the functional life which is the time a product should last regardless of external intervention to increase its lifespan.

Product lifetime represent an important area of enquiry with regard to product design, the circular economy and sustainable development. This is because products, with the materials involved in their design, production, distribution, use and disposal (across their life cycle), embody carbon due to the energy involved in these processes. Therefore, if product lifetimes can be extended, the use of energy, embodied in carbon, can be reduced and progress can be made towards reducing greenhouse gas emissions: Bocken et al. term this "Slowing resource loops" (309, their emphasis). In addition, excessive waste generation has been attributed to short-lived goods and a throwaway society.

In recent years, there has been a growth in academic and policy discussions around product lifetimes. For example, discussion of product lifetimes are an integral part of the European Commission's action plan for the circular economy. In academia, the PLATE (Product Lifetimes and the Environment) Consortium hosts regular conferences and seminars around the topic of product lifetimes and the environment (see: http://www.plateconference.org/). In the business world, the Canadian Kijiji platform's Secondhand Economy Index examines how consumers extend product lifetime through secondhand marketplaces, swapping, donating and renting/leasing/lending/pooling (see: https://www.kijiji.ca/kijijicentral/second-hand-economy/).

This article examines how product lifetimes are defined in the academic literature and discusses how product lifetimes can be measured. A distinction is made between the definition and measurement of actual and expected product lifetimes.

== Defining product lifetimes ==
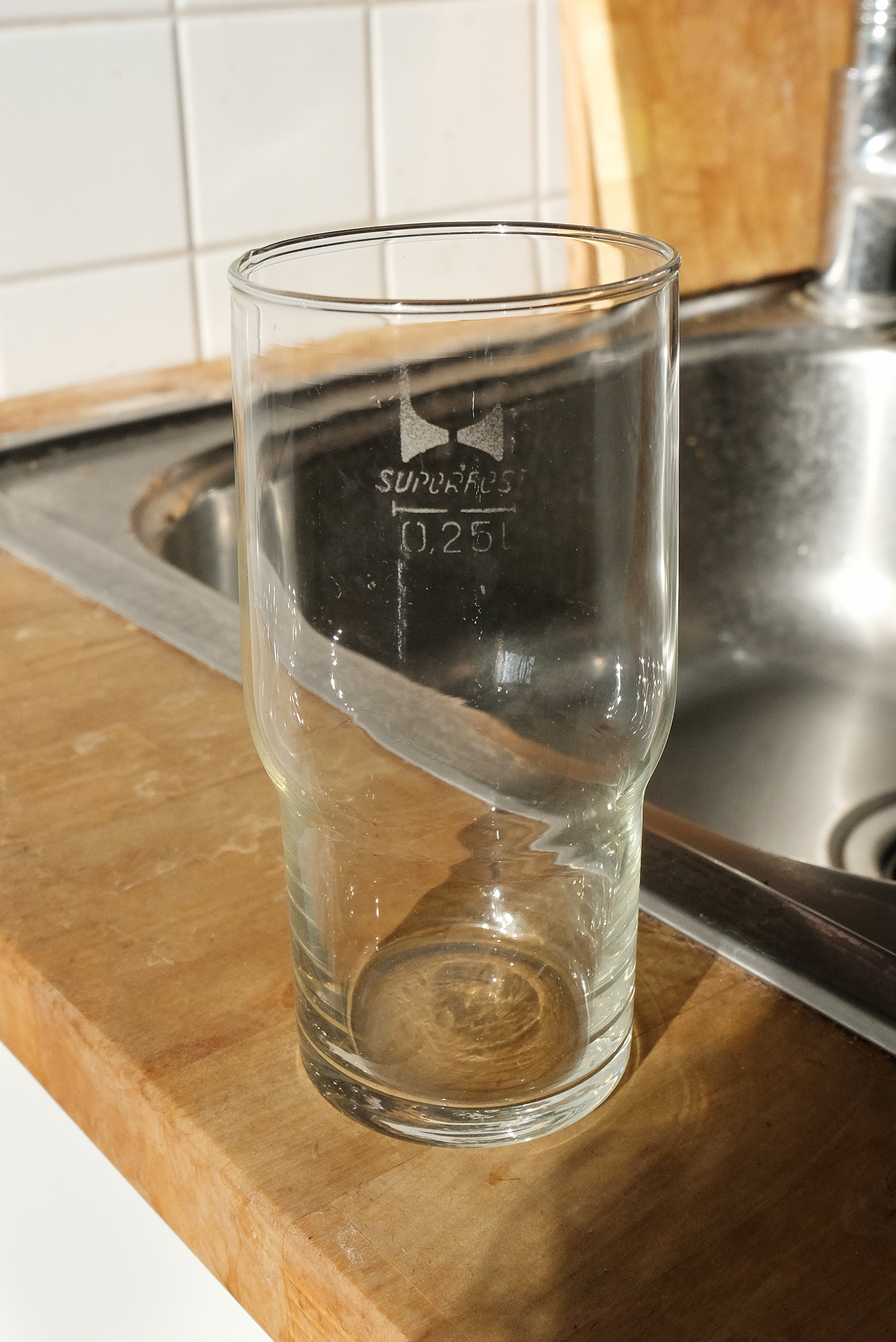
Branded Superfest glass

Definitions of product lifetimes vary depending on what aspects those conducting research are interested in. Generally, actual product lifetimes refer to the actual time that a product exists in a particular state. In contrast, expected product lifetimes refer to users' expectations for the lifetime of a product. Additionally, actual and expected product lifetimes are influenced by durability and longevity; these concepts are briefly outlined below.

Durability is described by Cooper as "the ability of a product to perform its required function over a lengthy period under normal use conditions of use without excessive expenditure on maintenance or repair" (p. 5). In contrast, longevity encompasses more than just the material properties of the product. Cooper notes that user behaviour, and broader social and cultural trends play important roles in the product's longevity. The paragraphs below outline the definitions of actual and expected product lifetimes.

=== Actual product lifetimes ===
Exhaustive work has been undertaken by Murakami et al. and Oguchi et al. and to outline several definitions and discuss methods for identifying actual product lifetimes. Murkami et al. identify the following overarching concepts in product lifetime definitions which are discussed below: Age, Residential time, Service life, Possession span and Duration of use.

==== Age ====
A product's age is the time from when the product was created to either the present or "the time of interest" (: 600) for the researchers.

==== Residential time ====
Residential time is considered to be time in which a product, its constituent materials and parts, exists in society. Residential time includes the time in which a product may be broken and/ or discarded.

==== Service life ====
According to Murkami et al., the service life of a product refers to the duration of time for which products continue to work and can be used.

==== Possession span ====
The possession span is the period of time that a user has possession of the product.

==== Duration of use ====
The duration of use indicates how long a user uses the product for. Murkami et al. distinguish duration of use from Service life by noting that duration of use is measured for a specific user, whereas Service life describes the total in-service use of the product for all its users (accounting for transfers of ownership e.g. reuse). Additionally, possession span is distinguished from duration of use, as possession span includes "dead storage" (: 601) time, where a product is owned by a user but not in use (i.e. in storage).

== Product lifetime extension ==
=== Product lifetime extension business models (PLEBM) ===
PLE is enacted through various entities that can be generically denominated as product lifetime extension business models (PLEBM) and which aim at improving product design (nature strategies) or increase the lifetime of the product during post-production phases (nurture strategies). Any organization could constitute a PLEBM for as long as it contributes to increase product lifetime. The Product lifetime extension business model (PLEBM) framework is a typology of PLE business models based on Osterwalder and Pigneur's (2010) framework.

=== Expected product lifetimes ===
A conference paper by Oguchi et al. sought to identify and test differences in definitions of product lifetime expectations. Oguchi et al. illustrated that previous research into expected product lifetimes has been inconsistent in its use of the term expected product lifetimes. For example, Cooper enquires about "reasonable" expected lifetimes, while Brook Lyndhurst discusses "normal" expected lifetimes. Wieser et al. identified the tension between everyday expectations and desires, distinguishing between these expectations in their study of 21 products. In addition, earlier work by Tasaki et al. and more recent work by WRAP have asked users to report both how long they have owned an item for, and how long they expect to use the item for in future: WRAP term this "active use". Building on these previous studies (described above), Oguchi et al. identified and tested three distinct definitions of expected product lifetimes, these are outlined below.

==== Intended lifetime ====
Oguchi et al. define the intended lifetime as the length of time for which a user intends to use the product in question.

==== Ideal lifetime ====
The ideal length of time for which a user expects their product to last. Oguchi et al. describe this as "the highest preference of consumers".

==== Predicted lifetime ====
The realist prediction by the user of how long a product will last. The user is thought to make this prediction based on their previous experiences and "other relevant factors" (Oguhci et al.).

== Measuring product lifetimes ==
Academic enquiry into the product lifetimes of electrical and electronic equipment was undertaken in 2000 by Cooper and Mayers who conducted household interviews and focus groups to establish the age at discard (actual product lifetime) and expected lifetimes for 17 products. Since this study, work has been undertaken by other academics into measuring actual and expected product lifetimes; the methods employed are outlined below.

=== Actual product lifetimes ===
Actual product lifetimes can be measured using a variety of methods which include: product testing, discard surveys, user interviews and modelling. These are discussed below.

==== Product testing ====
Products can be tested under laboratory conditions to assess their lifetime under different conditions of use.

==== Discard surveys ====
Oguchi et al. identify that surveys of waste treatment and recycling facilities can provide information on the age of the appliance at break or discard. Identifying information such as the product serial and/ or batch number can be used to find out a date of manufacturer from which the age of the appliance at break or discard can be calculated.

==== User interviews ====
Cooper and Mayers conducted household interviews to establish the age of 17 electrical and electronic items at discard and break. However it has been noted that user interviews are subject to the accuracy of memory, and that reviews of products which have failed in the past only provides information on "a historical situation" (: p. 10), not taking into account the features and lifetime of extant products.

==== Modelling ====
Product lifetimes can be modelled using extant data from surveys with the application of probability and other statistical concepts (e.g. distributions). One of the earliest attempts to estimate product lifetimes was undertaken by Pennock and Jaeger who utilised actuarial methods to measure the Service life of household goods for one owner. In the 1990s, Bayus modelled car replacement rates and Bayus and Gupta evaluated the user decision-making process and factors around replacement car purchases. In 2010, Oguchi et al. proposed modelling product lifetimes factoring the total number of products shipped and discarded in a year. Oguchi et al. outlined a series of equations which represent lifespan distributions for a given product at a particular point in time.

=== Expected product lifetimes ===
Expected product lifetimes are measured at the individual level using survey methods and collectively using focus groups. With the exception of Oguchi et al. and Wieser et al., many studies into expected product lifetimes have not distinguished between the different definitions (outlined above). The methods for measuring expected product lifetimes are outlined below.

==== Survey methods ====
Survey methods into expected product lifetimes encompass online questionnaires, household and telephone interviews. These studies asked individual participants to report their expectations for product lifetimes in units of time. Survey methods (such as Oguchi et al.) can also use Likert items to evaluate if current products meet users expectations with regard to durability and longevity.

==== Focus groups ====
Focus groups can be convened where participants take part in discussions to reach a group consensus on product lifetime expectations.

== See also ==
- Circular economy
- Design life
- Durability
- Durable good
- Maintainability
- Planned obsolescence
- Repairability
- Product stewardship
- Sustainable products
- Throwaway society
- Waste minimization
- Whole-life cost
