= Durability =

Ability of a product to continue to function

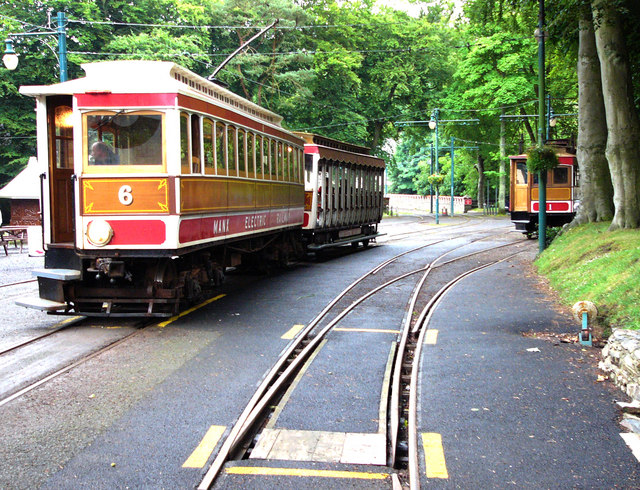
The Manx Electric Railway on the Isle of Man still operates with its original tramcars and trailers, all of which are over one hundred years old, the latest dating from 1906.

Durability is the ability of a physical product to remain functional, without requiring excessive maintenance or repair, when faced with the challenges of normal operation over its design lifetime. There are several measures of durability in use, including years of life, hours of use, and number of operational cycles. In economics, goods with a long usable life are referred to as durable goods.

Because there is no objective measure of durability for clothing, price has become an important indicator.

== Requirements for product durability ==
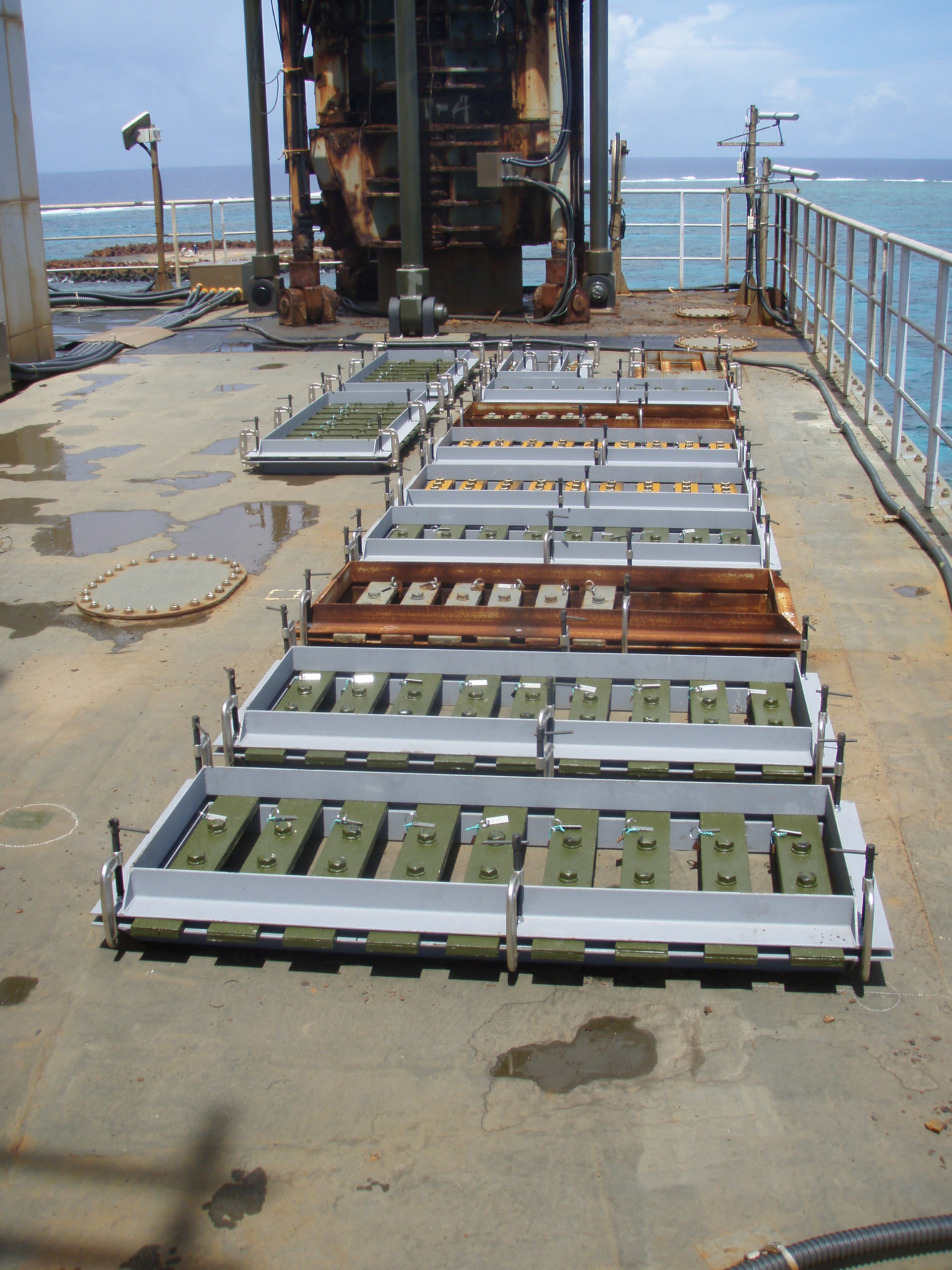
Durability test in Japan, 2010

Product durability is predicated by good repairability and regenerability in conjunction with maintenance. Every durable product must be capable of adapting to technical, technological and design developments. This must be accompanied by a willingness on the part of consumers to forgo having the "very latest" version of a product.

In the United Kingdom, durability as a characteristic relating to the quality of goods that can be demanded by consumers was not clearly established until an amendment of the Sale of Goods Act 1979 relating to the quality standards for supplied goods in 1994.

Reliability testing verifies the resistance of a product or material to wear. Common tests evaluate fatigue, abrasion, corrosion and exposure to environmental conditions.

== Product life spans and sustainable consumption ==
The lifespan of household goods is a significant factor in sustainable consumption. Longer product life spans can contribute to eco-efficiency and sufficiency, thus slowing consumption in order to progress towards a sustainable level of consumption. Cooper (2005) proposed a model to demonstrate the crucial role of product lifespans to sustainable production and consumption.

== Types ==
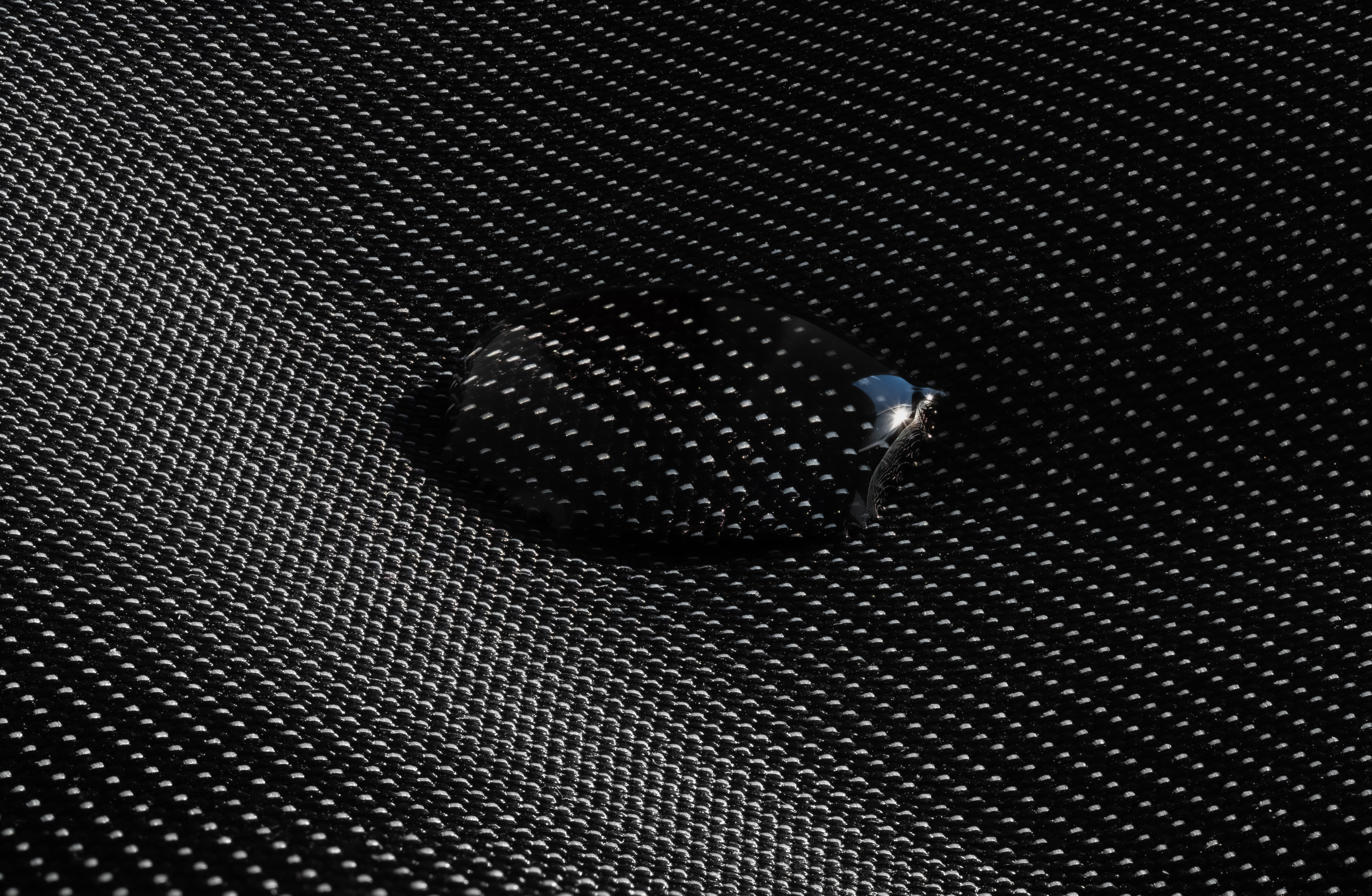
Waterproof textile, 2021

Durability can encompass several specific physical properties of designed products, including:

- Ageing (of polymers)
- Dust resistance
- Resistance to fatigue
- Fire resistance
- Radiation hardening
- Thermal resistance
- Rot-proofing
- Rustproofing
- Toughness
- Waterproofing

== Examples ==
- Chemically strengthened glass e.g. Superfest
- Durable medical equipment
- Durable water repellent

== See also ==
- Availability
- Consumables
  - Disposable product
- Interchangeable parts
- Maintainability
- Product life
- Product stewardship
- Throwaway society
- Waste minimization
