= Throw-away society =

Human society strongly influenced by consumerism

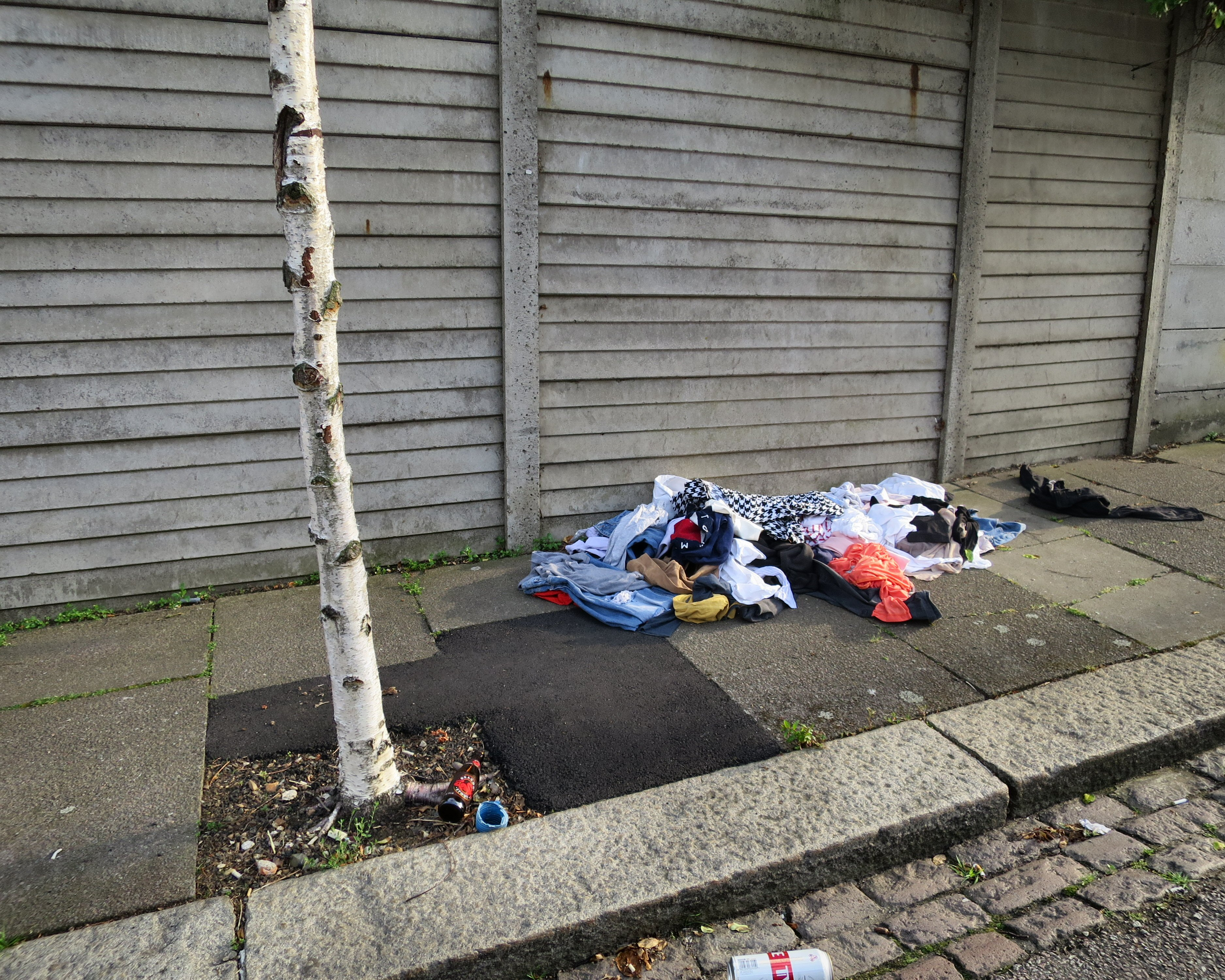
Discarded clothes in London

The throw-away society is a generalised description of human social concept strongly influenced by consumerism, whereby the society tends to use items once only, from disposable packaging, and consumer products not designed for reuse (e.g. single use products) or lifetime use (e.g. inexpensive fast fashion). The term describes a critical view of overconsumption and excessive production of short-lived or disposable items over durable goods that can be repaired, but at its origins, it was viewed as a positive attribute.

== Origin of the term ==
In its 1 August 1955 issue, Life published an article titled "Throwaway Living". This article has been cited as the source that first used the term "throw-away society".

== Rise of packaging waste ==
The last century of economic growth saw both increased production and increased product waste. Between 1906 (the start of New York City waste collections) and 2005 there was a tenfold rise in "product waste" (packaging and old products), from 92 to 1,242 pounds (42 to 563 kg) per person per year. Containers and packaging now represent 32 percent of all municipal solid waste. Non-durable goods (defined as products in use for less than three years) constitute 27 percent, while durable goods comprise 16 percent.

== Food service and disposable food packaging ==
Disposable tableware was a key part of the business strategy of chain fast food restaurants in the US. Fast food chains could cut costs by convincing consumers through advertising campaigns to carry their own tableware to a waste bin, to avoid the labor of clearing tables. The savings in wages offset the cost of the tableware.

In 2002, Taiwan began taking action to reduce the use of disposable tableware at institutions and businesses, and to reduce the use of plastic bags. Yearly, the nation of 17.7 million people was producing 59,000 tonnes (58,000 long tons; 65,000 short tons) of disposable tableware waste and 105,000 tonnes (103,000 long tons; 116,000 short tons) of waste plastic bags, and increasing measures have been taken in the years since then to reduce the amount of waste. In 2013, Taiwan's Environmental Protection Administration (EPA) banned outright the use of disposable tableware in the nation's 968 schools, government agencies and hospitals. The ban is expected to eliminate 2,600 tonnes (2,600 long tons; 2,900 short tons) of waste yearly.

In Germany, Austria, and Switzerland, laws banning use of disposable food and drink containers at large-scale events have been enacted. Such a ban has been in place in Munich, Germany since 1991, applying to all city facilities and events. This includes events of all sizes, including very large ones (Christmas market, Auer-Dult Faire, Oktoberfest and Munich City Marathon). For small events of a few hundred people, the city has arranged for a corporation offer rental of crockery and dishwasher equipment. In part through this regulation, Munich reduced the waste generated by Oktoberfest, which attracts tens of thousands of people, from 11,000 metric tons in 1990 to 550 tons in 1999.

China produces about 57 billion pairs of single-use chopsticks yearly, of which half are exported. About 45 percent are made from trees – about 3.8 million of them – mainly cotton wood, birch, and spruce, the remainder being made from bamboo. Japan uses about 24 billion pairs of these disposables per year, and globally about 80 billion pairs are thrown away by about 1.4 billion people. Reusable chopsticks in restaurants have a lifespan of 130 meals. In Japan, with disposable ones costing about 2 cents and reusable ones costing typically $1.17, the reusables better the $2.60 breakeven cost. Campaigns in several countries to reduce this waste are beginning to have some effect.

== Waste and socioeconomic status ==
Waste from disposable products is often shipped from richer to poorer nations, causing environmental and social problems for developing nations. Most notable are the large shipments of trash from North America and Western Europe to Africa and Asia due to the relatively low cost of disposal. By the 1990s, over half of all nations in Africa have faced negative externalities from toxic waste dumped by richer countries. Waste, both toxic and non-toxic is often dumped without safety regulations. It is thrown in unlined and unregulated landfills where it contaminates soil and water, and even burnt, which circulates toxins in the air. Recently, electronic waste shipped to Nigeria has increased due to higher consumption of electronics by North America and Europe, with hundreds of shipments of old electronics dropped off at Lagos, Nigeria, every month. A significantly large percentage of the trash being hazardous waste shipped with the "explicit intent of cheap (and unsafe) disposal". China also receives huge amounts of waste, often toxic material, averaging 1.9 million tons per year, because companies find it cheaper to ship garbage away rather than dispose of it themselves.

== Food waste ==
In 2004, a University of Arizona study indicates that forty to fifty percent of all edible food never gets eaten. Every year $43 billion worth of edible food is estimated to be thrown away.

== The rise of mass consumption in America ==
Following the end of World War II, America experienced a boom in mass consumption. There was a sharp increase in suburban life, disposable packaging, and convenience goods as well as the development of new plastics. Throughout World War II, it became a popular mentality that restricting the types of products consumed during the war by closely following the rationing put into effect by the United States Government was a way to help the wartime effort and aid America in victory. The promises of manufacturers that the effort that Americans put in during the war would then yield luxurious goods once the war ended assisted in deepening the belief of the American public in supporting rationing. Once the war ended, manufacturers held true to those sentiments promoted during the war. When the term "throwaway living" was first coined by Life magazine, the magazine used the phrase in a positive way: one that depicted a life that was easier and still economical for the home's caretaker. This led to certain Americans viewing thrifting as "un-American", which was a stark contrast to how American society saw thrifting before the war. This rise in consumption-led American society is what allowed America to become a throw-away society. The practice of planned obsolescence, the act of creating products with the intention of those products needed a replacement, became widespread. In addition to planned obsolescence, it was common for products to be slightly changed every year to encourage people to purchase a newer version, even when not necessary.

== Overconsumption in the fashion industry ==
Since the early 2000s, clothing sales have doubled from 100 to 200 billion units per year showing the increase in demand for textiles. In correlation to this increase, an estimated 92 million tons of clothing related waste is discarded every year.

An increase in demand for textiles can be explained by many factors, but more recently there has been an increase in clothing consumption due to fashion influencers. In 2021, the global fashion influencer market was valued at 7.36 billion dollars and is expected to steadily grow at a CAGR of 32.5% from 2022 to 2029. Since their content is mainly centered around fashion, they are constantly cycling through and showing new garments to create updated "looks" for their followers. In a survey done by Marketing Dive, it states that 86% of the people surveyed have bought apparel or accessories because they saw it on an influencer that they followed. This correlation between influencer marketing and the increase in consumption has led to the newly fast-paced life cycle of clothing otherwise referred to as 'style obsolescence'. In this cycle people are constantly throwing-away clothing that is no longer "on trend" in order to make space for new and more popular styles. While participating in this cycle of staying on top of the trends, shoppers satisfy their want for instant gratification and begin to disregard the effects that throwing away clothing can have on our environment.

Over the past few years, throw-away culture has worsened as the average amount of time a person wears a garment is 7 to 10 times before discarding it. That amount of time has decreased by 36% in the last 15 years. Additionally, in the United States alone, the average consumer throws away an average of 81.5 pounds of clothing every year. That equates to an estimate of 11.3 million tons of garments being thrown away into U.S. landfills yearly.

== Women's interaction with the start of American throw-away society ==
Women had long been the primary shoppers for the household and many of the ads that promoted these disposable and convenience goods also made women their target audience. In the aforementioned Life magazine article, it specifically mentioned that "no housewife need bother" in regards to extensive household chores because disposable products will cut down on the cleaning time required.

Women in these middle-class homes began earning an income in order to be able to purchase more of these convenience goods. Some did this through the means of finding a more traditional job, but many also turned to multi-level marketing businesses such as Tupperware to supplement their husband's income. Tupperware encouraged women to sell as many Tupperware products as possible, so as the brand increased in popularity, the number of plastic goods in American homes did too. Outside of direct sales, it contributed to consumption because the women who sold through Tupperware had the incentive that they would receive household appliances once they reached the sales goal set by the company.

== Early forms of pushback in America ==
Despite it being initially viewed as a positive attribute to strive for, at least early as 1967, some companies began separating themselves from other American advertisers. In a 1967 edition of the New York Times, an article discussing plans for expansion for the leather goods company, Mark Cross, used a slogan from a then recently published Mark Cross Advertisement: "It's a throwaway society, man. Buy it. Break it. Chuck it. Replace it. Do you believe that? Mark Cross is not for you." The growing company was trying to expand off of marketing long-lasting products rather than disposable goods.

== Planned obsolescence ==
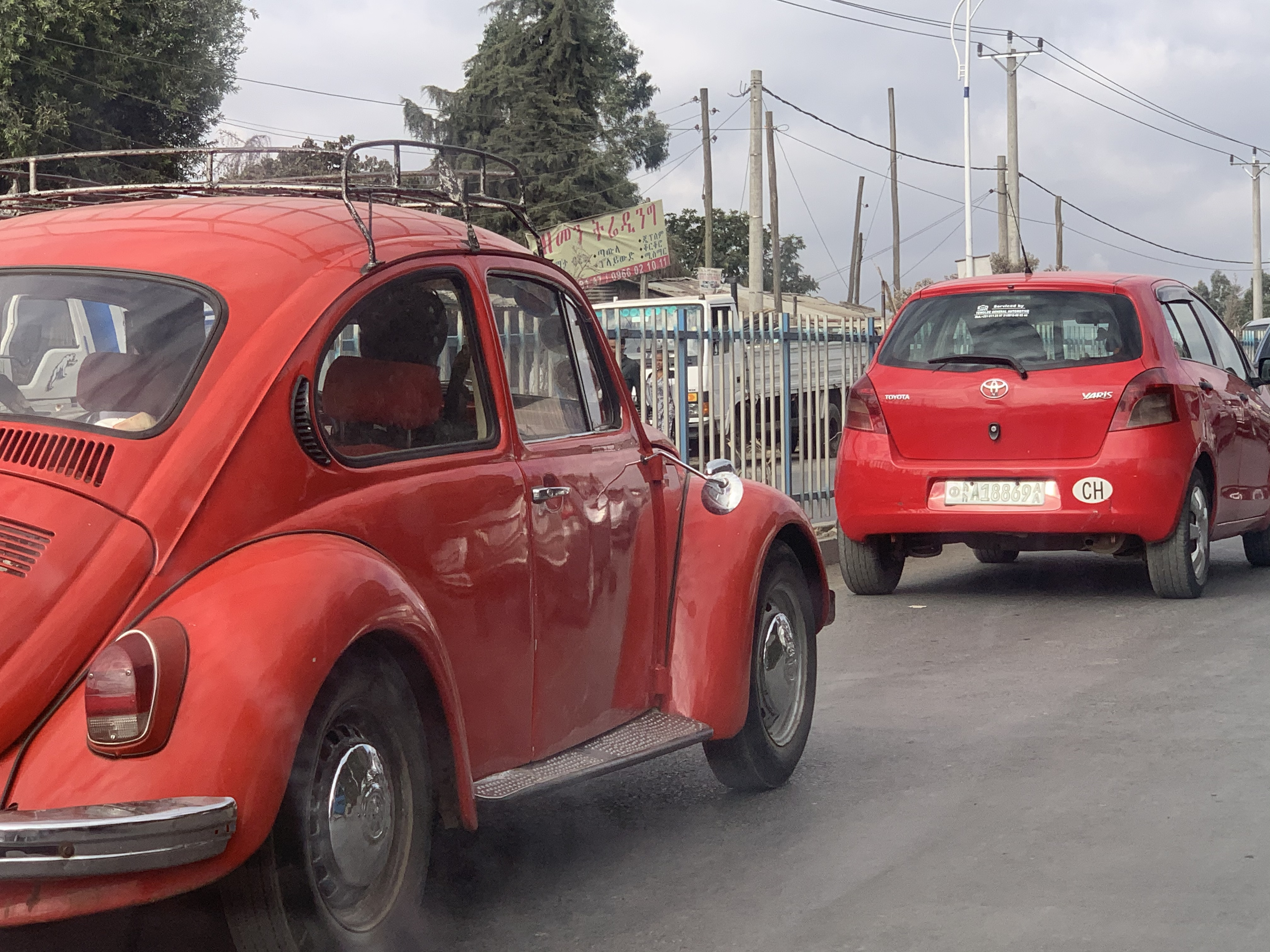
Early generation VW Beetle cars still compete with newer compact vehicles in many segments around the world.

"Planned obsolescence" is a manufacturing philosophy developed in the 1920s and 1930s, when mass production became popular. The goal is to make a product or part that will fail, or become less desirable over time or after a certain amount of use. Vance Packard, author of The Waste Makers (1960), called this "the systematic attempt of business to make us wasteful, debt-ridden, permanently discontented individuals".

== Durability of goods ==
Producers make goods disposable rather than durable so that consumers must continue to repurchase the good, earning the producer a steady supply of customers, rather than a one-time purchase. Profit is maximized for the firm when the usefulness of a good is "uneconomically short", because firms can spend the least amount possible creating a nondurable good, which they sell repeatedly to the customer.

Goods are often replaced even before their usefulness runs out. The perceived durability of a good in a throwaway society is often less than its physical durability. For example, in fast fashion, consumers buy the latest, novelty item because producers market styles that pass with the seasons. There is pressure on producers to advertise an increased number of "seasons", creating new styles so consumers can update their wardrobes often by buying cheap and flimsy, yet stylish clothes to keep up with current fashion trends. Products that once were considered durable are now almost exclusively disposable, so it is more difficult for consumers who want a durable version to find anywhere selling one. The shift to disposable was ostensibly for better convenience or hygiene, even if the inconvenience of using a durable version is very slight, or there is no proven increase in hygiene. This can lead to higher costs over time, more waste produced, more resources used, and lower quality goods.

Not only has there been a movement by manufacturers towards goods that are less durable and not maintainable, producers have also withheld technology that would make common goods more durable, such as in the manufacture of light bulbs.

== Attitude of the Catholic Church ==
Pope Francis frequently spoke about a "throwaway culture" in which unwanted items and unwanted people, such as the unborn, the elderly, and the poor, are discarded as waste. In his encyclical Laudato si', he discusses pollution, waste, the lack of recycling, and the destruction of the Earth as symptoms of this throwaway culture.

Francis stated that in a throwaway culture, even human lives are seen as disposable. He also cited the dangers of this culture in connection with immigration, saying, "A change of attitude towards migrants and refugees is needed on the part of everyone, moving away from attitudes of defensiveness and fear, indifference and marginalization – all typical of a throwaway culture – towards attitudes based on a culture of encounter, the only culture capable of building a better, more just and fraternal world."

== See also ==
- Circular economy
- Consumer education
- Design life
- Ethical consumerism
- Fast fashion
- Freeganism
- Litter
- Product life
  - Service life
- Source reduction
- Sustainable product
- Zero waste
