= Chemically strengthened glass =

Chemically strengthened glass is a type of glass that has increased strength as a result of a post-production chemical process. When broken, it still shatters in long pointed splinters similar to float glass. For this reason, it is not considered a safety glass and must be laminated if safety glass is required. However, chemically strengthened glass is typically six to eight times the strength of float glass. The most common trademark for this kind of glass is Gorilla Glass.

== History ==
Glass is one of the oldest materials created by humans, dating back to about 4,000 years ago, when craftsmen working in Mesopotamia, the land between the Tigris and Euphrates Rivers, discovered the art of mixing sand, soda, and lime to make glass. Throughout the ages, humans have explored early ion exchange in glass to decorate and color glass artefacts with silver or copper powders.

It was only around the beginning of the 20th century that the foundations for a possible application of the ion-exchange process in the technical-industrial field were laid. In 1913 Günther Schulze was the first to study the diffusion of silver ions into the glass using silver nitrate salt (AgNO_{3}) as ion source, starting a whole series of studies aimed to understand the chemical and physical nature of the phenomenon and its effects on some physical properties of the glass so treated. In particular, a few years later, in 1918 at the Schott Glass Laboratory, it was demonstrated that ion-exchange produces an increase of the refractive index of the layer of the glass involved in the diffusive process.

After the development of Pyroceram in the 1950s, Corning Inc. began a research and development program called Project Muscle to improve the hardness of glass. By that time, the ion exchange technique had become a well-understood industrial process. S. Donald Stookey started research into using it for strengthening by June 1960, and the topic was discussed at a symposium in Florence in September 1961, but it was Steven Kistler and, independently, Paul Henri Acloque and Jean Paul Tochon of Saint-Gobain who managed to improve the compressive strength threefold in 1962. Replacement of smaller sodium ions (Na^{+}) with larger potassium ones (K^{+}) in the pristine glass matrix was able to prevent or heal over the possible formation of micro/nano-cracks on the specimen surface, increasing its mechanical strength. Soon Corning researchers found that addition of aluminium and zirconium oxides improved the qualities even further. Since then, many efforts have been carried out in this field both at the research and industrial levels.

== Process principle ==
The actual strength of the glass is not significantly altered by the ion exchange process. Instead, a state of beneficial residual stress is introduced by a surface finishing process. Glass is submersed in a bath of a molten potassium salt (typically potassium nitrate) at temperatures of 334 °C (630 °F) or greater. This causes sodium ions in the glass surface to be replaced by potassium ions from the bath.

These potassium ions are larger than the sodium ions and therefore wedge into the gaps left by the smaller sodium ions when they migrate to the molten potassium nitrate. This replacement of ions causes the surface of the glass to be in a state of compression and the core in compensating tension. The surface compression of chemically strengthened glass may reach up to 690 megapascals (100,000 psi).

The strengthening mechanism depends on the fact that the compressive strength of glass is significantly higher than its tensile strength. With both surfaces of the glass already in compression, it takes a certain amount of bending before one of the surfaces can even go into tension. More bending is required to reach the tensile strength. The other surface simply experiences more and more compressive stress. But since the compressive strength is so much larger, no compressive failure is experienced.

Because the surface of chemically strengthened glass is in compression, it is also significantly more scratch resistant than untreated glass. This is why cell phone screens are typically made this way. Since phones are commonly carried in a pocket or purse with items such as keys, scratch resistance is important.

There also exists a more advanced two-stage process for making chemically strengthened glass, in which the glass article is first immersed in a sodium nitrate bath at 450 °C (842 °F), which enriches the surface with sodium ions. This leaves more sodium ions on the glass for the immersion in potassium nitrate to replace with potassium ions. In this way, the use of a sodium nitrate bath increases the potential for surface compression in the finished article.

Chemical strengthening results in a strengthening similar to toughened glass. However, the process does not use extreme variations of temperature and therefore chemically strengthened glass has little or no bow or warp, optical distortion, or strain pattern. This differs from toughened glass, in which slender pieces can be significantly bowed.

Also unlike toughened glass, chemically strengthened glass may be cut after strengthening, but loses its added strength within approximately 20 mm of the cut. Similarly, when the surface of chemically strengthened glass is deeply scratched, this area loses its additional strength.

Another negative of chemically strengthened glass is the added cost. While tempered glass can be made cheaply through the fabrication process, chemically strengthened glass has a more expensive route to the market. These costs make the product prohibitive for use in many applications.

Chemically strengthened glass was used for the aircraft canopy of some fighter aircraft.

== See also ==
- Architectural glass
- Superfest
- Ion exchange
- Glass-ceramic
