= Gorilla Glass =

Chemically strengthened glass made by Corning

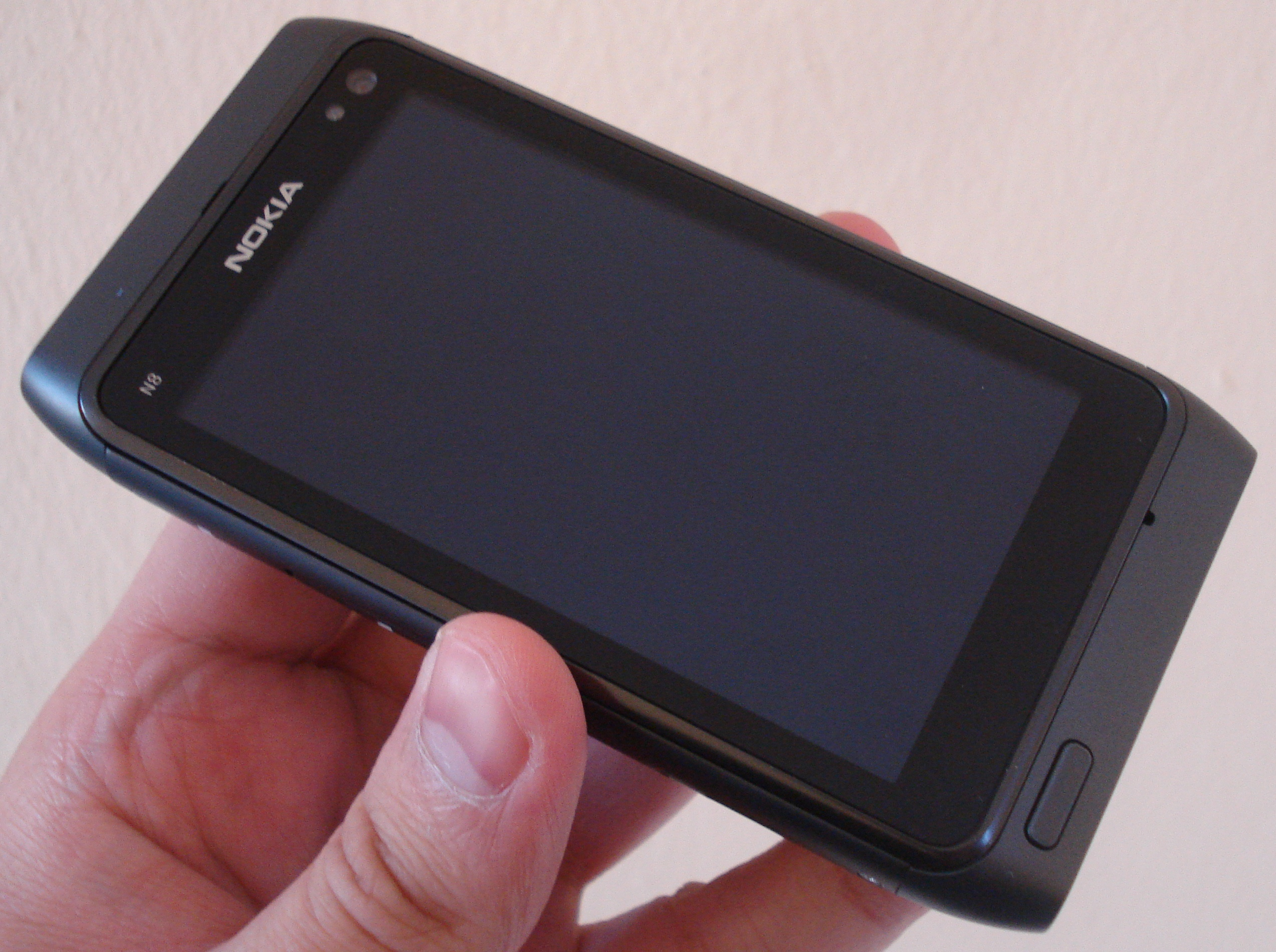
- A Nokia N8 smartphone utilizing a Gorilla Glass screen
- Product type: Chemically strengthened aluminosilicate glass
- Current owner: Corning Inc.
- Country: United States
- Introduced: February 2008; 18 years ago
- Related brands: Chemcor (predecessor)
- Markets: Worldwide
- Website: www.corning.com/gorillaglass/worldwide/en.html

Gorilla Glass is a brand of chemically strengthened glass developed and manufactured by Corning Inc. Currently in its ninth generation, it is designed to be thin, light, and damage-resistant. Its surface strength and crack-resistance are achieved through immersion in a hot potassium-salt ion-exchange bath.

The alkali-aluminosilicate sheet glass is primarily used as cover glass for portable electronic devices, including smartphones, smartwatches, portable media players, portable computer displays, and television screens. It is manufactured in Harrodsburg, United States; Asan, South Korea; and in Taiwanese cities of Taichung and Tainan. As of October 2017, Gorilla Glass was used in approximately five billion devices worldwide. Despite its market dominance, Gorilla Glass faces competition from similar products, including AGC Inc.'s Dragontrail, Schott AG's Xensation, and synthetic sapphire.

== Background and development ==
Corning experimented with chemically strengthened glass in 1960 as part of a "Project Muscle" initiative. Replacement of smaller sodium ions with larger potassium ones by a chemical treatment in order to improve the compressive strength of the surface layer of a glass was first developed by Steven Kistler in 1962. Soon Corning researchers found that addition of aluminium and zirconium oxides improved the qualities even further.

Within a few years they had developed a "muscled glass" marketed as Chemcor. The product was used until the early 1990s in commercial and industrial applications, including automotive, aviation and pharmaceutical uses, notably in approximately 100 Dodge Dart and Plymouth Barracuda racing cars in 1968, where minimizing the vehicle's weight was essential.

Experimentation was revived in 2005, investigating whether the glass could be made thin enough for use in consumer electronics. Although not called Gorilla Glass at the time, it was brought into commercial use with the launch of the iPhone in June 2007. The iPhone that Steve Jobs revealed in January 2007 still featured a plastic display. The day after he held up the plastic iPhone on stage, Jobs complained about scratches that had developed on the phone's display after carrying it around in his pocket. Apple then contacted Corning and asked for a thin, toughened glass to be used in its new phone. The scratch-resistant glass that shipped on the first-generation iPhone would eventually come to be known as Gorilla Glass, officially introduced in February 2008. Corning further developed the material for a variety of smartphones and other consumer electronics devices for a range of companies.

Corning markets the material's primary properties as its high scratch-resistance (protective coating) and its hardness (with a Vickers hardness test rating of 622 to 701), which allows the glass to be thin without being fragile. The glass can be recycled.

In December 2015, Ford announced that it would use the material for the windshield and rear window of its second-generation Ford GT sports car going on sale in 2016. It later spread to mainstream models such as the Ford F-150 and Jeep Wrangler.

== Manufacture ==
During its manufacture, the glass is toughened by ion exchange. The material is immersed in a molten alkaline potassium salt at a temperature of approximately 400 °C (750 °F), wherein smaller sodium ions in the glass are replaced by larger potassium ions from the salt bath. The larger ions occupy more volume and thereby create a surface layer of high residual compressive stress, giving the glass surface increased strength, the ability to contain flaws, and overall crack-resistance, making it resistant to damage from everyday use.

== Generations ==
Gorilla Glass, first used on the original iPhone upon its release in June 2007, was formally unveiled in February 2008. By 2010, the glass had been used in approximately 20% of mobile handsets worldwide, or about 200 million units.

Gorilla Glass 2 was introduced in January 2012 20% thinner than the original Gorilla Glass. It was first used on the Samsung Galaxy S III. In October 2012, Corning said that over one billion mobile devices used Gorilla Glass.

Gorilla Glass 3 was introduced at CES 2013 on January 7. According to Corning, the material is up to three times more scratch-resistant than the previous version, with enhanced ability to resist deep scratches that typically weaken glass. Promotional material for Gorilla Glass 3 claims that it is 40% more scratch-resistant, and more flexible. The design of Gorilla Glass 3 was Corning's first use of atomic-scale modeling before the material was melted in laboratories, with the prediction of the optimal composition obtained through the application of rigidity theory. The first phone to use Gorilla Glass 3 was the Samsung Galaxy S4.

When Gorilla Glass 3 was announced, Corning indicated that areas for future improvement included reducing reflectivity and susceptibility to fingerprint smudges, changing surface treatments, and the way the glass is finished. Antimicrobial Gorilla Glass, with antibacterial ionic silver incorporated into its surface, was introduced and demonstrated at CES in January 2014.

Gorilla Glass 4 was introduced in November 2014. It has better damage resistance and capability to be made thinner with the same performance as its predecessor. It was first used on the Samsung Galaxy Alpha.

Gorilla Glass 5 was introduced in July 2016. It is more resistant to cracking from drops than earlier glasses, and was first used on the Samsung Galaxy Note 7.

Gorilla Glass SR+ was introduced in August 2016, designed for wearable mobile devices and focusing on toughness, scratch-resistance, and optical clarity. It was first used on the Samsung Gear S3 smartwatch.

Gorilla Glass 6 was introduced in July 2018. It has the scratch-resistance of Gorilla Glass 5, but is designed to withstand multiple drops from greater heights. It was first used on the Samsung Galaxy S10.

Gorilla Glass DX and DX+ were introduced in July 2018, following the launch of Gorilla Glass 6. An extension of Gorilla Glass SR+, Gorilla Glass DX has enhanced anti-reflective optics with the same scratch-resistance as Gorilla Glass. Gorilla Glass DX+ provides superior scratch resistance. While primarily intended for wearable mobile devices, developments were underway to adapt these new glasses to larger areas. Gorilla Glass DX+ was first used on the Samsung Galaxy Watch.

Gorilla Glass 3+ was introduced in August 2019, with better drop resistance than 3, approaching that of Gorilla Glass 5.

Gorilla Glass Victus was introduced in July 2020. It improves drop performance, and is claimed by Corning to be twice as scratch-resistant as Gorilla Glass 6. It was first used on the Samsung Galaxy Note 20 Ultra.

In July 2021, Corning announced that its Gorilla Glass DX and DX+ glass composites would be used to protect smartphone phone camera lenses, first by Samsung, in the Galaxy Z Fold 3 and Galaxy Z Flip 3.

Gorilla Glass Victus 2 was introduced in November 2022. with a new composition for improved drop performance on rough surfaces like concrete, and unchanged scratch-resistance. However, according to one user report, the glass is susceptible to micro-scratches; it has been suggested that this could be due to the use of softer materials for improved resistance to shattering. Gorilla Glass Victus 2 was first used on the Samsung Galaxy S23 series.

Gorilla Glass's ninth generation, branded Gorilla Armor, was introduced in January 2024. Although Corning has not directly compared it to the previous generation, the company claims that the glass performs up to three times better in drop tests onto concrete and is four times more scratch-resistant than competitive aluminosilicate cover glasses. It is also claimed to reduce reflection by up 75% compared to a typical glass surface. It was first used on the Samsung Galaxy S24 Ultra.

Gorilla Glass 7i was introduced in June 2024, for less expensive phones. It offers enhanced drop protection and scratch-resistance, outperforming competitive lithium aluminosilicate glasses. According to Corning, Gorilla Glass 7i can withstand drops from up to one meter (3.3 ft) onto rough surfaces, an improvement over similar materials that typically fail at half that height, while also being up to twice as scratch-resistant.

Gorilla Armor 2 was introduced in January 2025, the first Gorilla Glass to use glass-ceramic materials. Armor 2 enhances drop performance due to its glass-ceramic composition. In Corning's lab tests, Armor 2 survived drops of up to 2.2 meters (7.2 ft) onto a surface replicating concrete, while maintaining its scratch-resistance. It was first used on the Samsung Galaxy S25 Ultra.

In May 2025, Corning introduced Gorilla Glass Ceramic 2, first used on the Samsung Galaxy S25 Edge.

=== Comparison of properties ===
Generation	1	2	3	4	5	SR+ (Note: For wearable mobile devices)	6	DX/DX+	3+	Victus	Victus 2	Armor	7i	Armor 2	Ceramic 2	Ceramic 3
Announced	Feb 2008	Jan 2012	Jan 2013	Nov 2014	Jul 2016	Aug 2016	Jul 2018	Jul 2018	Aug 2019	Jul 2020	Nov 2022	Jan 2024	Jun 2024	Jan 2025	May 2025	March 2026
Density in g/cm^{3}	2.45	2.42	2.39	2.42	2.43		2.4			2.4	2.41		2.41		2.48	2.51
Young's modulus in GPa	73.3	71.5	70	65.8	77		77			77	79		77		103	104
Poisson's ratio	0.21	0.21	0.22	0.22	0.21		0.21			0.21	0.22		0.22		0.19	0.19
Shear modulus in GPa	30.1	29.6	28.5	26	31.7		31.9			31.4	32.2		31.8		43.1	43.4
Vickers hardness (200g load): Unstrengthened in kgf/mm^{2}	622	534	555	489	559		611			590	595		591		640	640
Vickers hardness (200g load): Strengthened in kgf/mm^{2}	701	649	653	596	608		678			651	670		658		660	670
Fracture toughness in MPa·m^{0.5}	0.7	0.68	0.66	0.67	0.69		0.7			0.76	0.82		0.78		1.15	1.16
Coefficient of thermal expansion (0–300°C) in 10^{−7}/°C	91.0	81.4	75.8	86.9	78.8		75.2			72.5	58.8		59.9		65.9	68.9

== Related products ==
Superfest is a chemically hardened glass also known as Ceverit and CV-Glas. It was developed in East Germany in the 1970s.

On October 26, 2011, Corning announced the commercial launch of Lotus Glass, designed for OLED and next-generation LC displays. The intrinsic thermal consistency of Lotus Glass allows it to retain its shape and quality during high-temperature processing. Decreased compaction and variation during the crystallization and activation step further reduce stress and distortions to the substrate. This enables tighter design rules in advanced backplanes for higher resolution and faster response time. According to Corning, Gorilla Glass is specifically a cover glass for the exterior of display devices while Lotus Glass is designed as a glass substrate to be used within liquid crystal display panels; a product could use both Gorilla Glass and Lotus Glass.

On February 2, 2012, Corning and Samsung signed an agreement to establish a new equity venture for the manufacture of specialty glass substrates for the OLED device market in Korea, based on Lotus Glass. Lotus XT Glass became available in 2013.

In 2012, Corning introduced Willow Glass, a flexible glass based on borosilicate glass, launched for use as a display substrate.

Ceramic Shield, a ceramic-hardened front glass, was co-developed with Apple and as of 2020 was used on all iPhones from iPhone 12 onwards (except the third-generation iPhone SE). Ceramic Shield 2 was introduced in 2025 and used for the iPhone 17.

== See also ==
- Overflow downdraw method
- Tempered glass
