= Zwiesel Kristallglas =

Crystal glass manufacturer based in Zwiesel in the Bavarian Forest

Coordinates: 49.0172°N 13.2274°E

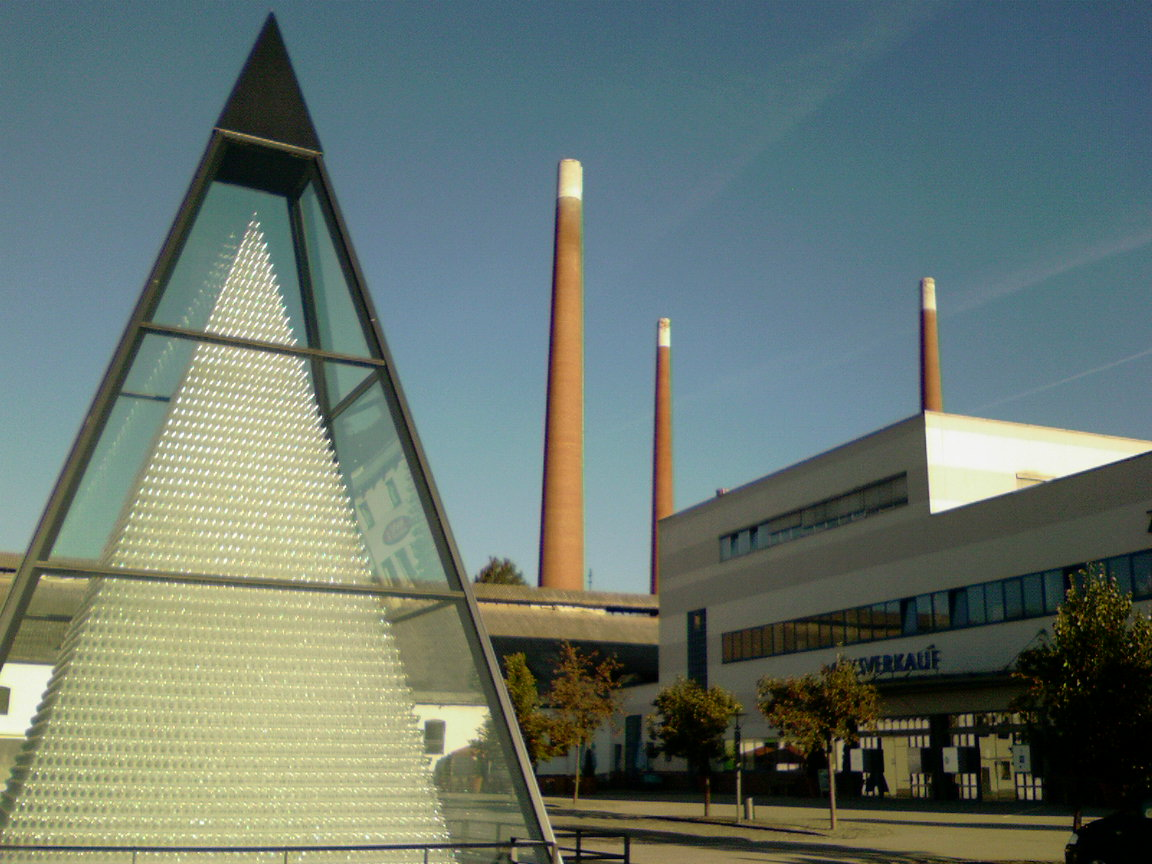
The crystal glass pyramid

Zwiesel Kristallglas AG is a manufacturer of crystal glass located in Zwiesel, Germany.

== History ==
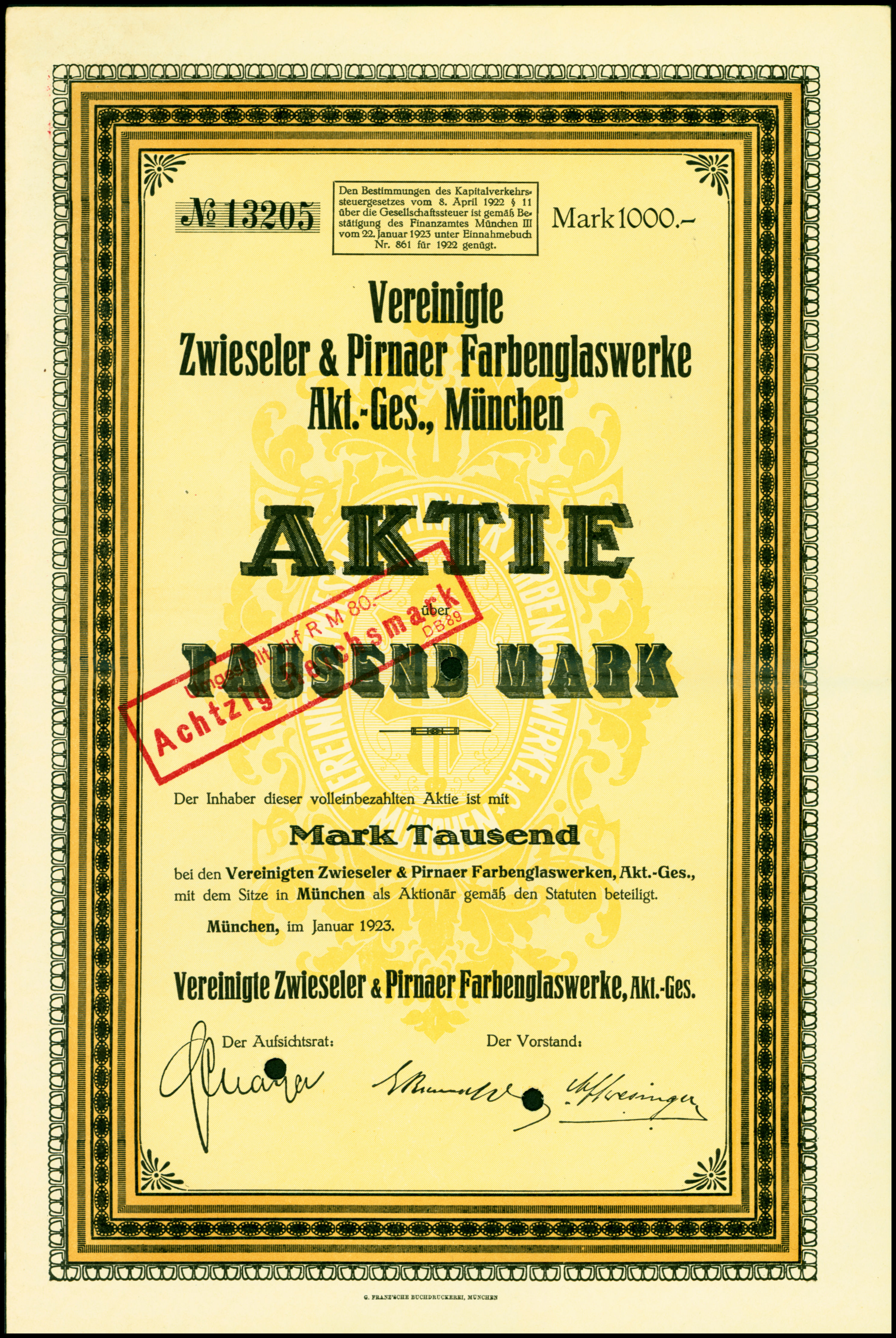
Share of the Vereinigte Zwieseler und Pirnaer Farbenglaswerke AG, issued January 1923

=== Founding ===
A logo of Zwiesel Kristallglas

On 25 November 1872 sheet glass was manufactured for the first time in a new glassworks, whose designer was the Zwiesel carter, Anton Mueller. In 1878 a storage hall, a house and stables were added for the factory manager; in 1883 the factory pub was opened.

=== Sale ===
On 7 November 1884, Mueller sold the factory with the buildings and a surface area of altogether 3.045 hectares for 36,000 Goldmarks to the brothers Theodor and Gustav Tasche of Cologne. The Zwieseler Farbenglashütte Gebrüder Tasche, generally only called Tasche Glassworks, was converted into a corporation on 21 June 1898. The share capital of the Zwieseler Farbenglashütten, vorm. Gebrüder Tasche, Aktiengesellschaft amounted to 525,000 marks.

=== Renaming and expansion ===
On 1 September 1899, a glass plant in Pirna was acquired for 675,000 marks and the company was renamed the Vereinigte Zwieseler und Pirnaer Farbenglaswerke AG. The share capital was increased to 1,200,000 marks. The Zwieseler plant supplied antique glass, so-called "Pirna Kathedralglas".

The enterprise was constantly extended and equipped with new technical equipment. The years 1914 to 1918 during World War I, as well as the postwar years, brought significant difficulties. In 1924 the production range was extended, as container glass was produced for the first time for drinking glasses.

== Part of Schott AG ==
In 1927, increasing automation and sharp competition led to a majority share of the Jenaer Glaswerk Schott & Gen, which was finally acquired in 1929. The manufacturing of sheet glass in Zwiesel was abandoned in 1931 in favour of bottle glass production. At that time the plant employed about 450 persons in Zwiesel. During the 1930s glass production stagnated. Due to the scarcity of raw materials in World War II, bottle glass production was stopped altogether on 22 April 1944 and only war-important optical glass was produced.

Since the Vereinigten Farbenglaswerke AG, as the Jenaer Glaswerk Schott & Gen. was called after 1940, lost its main facilities in Jena due to the war, production of optical glass was continued in Zwiesel, until on 10 May 1952 the new main plant in Mainz was opened.

== Colour glass plant ==
In Zwiesel a colour glass plant started manufacturing crystal glass in 1953. In 1961 the machine production of cup glasses began, which were quite successful on the glass market. In 1972 the Zwieseler company took over sales of the well-known heat-proof and chemically resistant "Jena glass". On 17 August 1972 the company was renamed Schott Zwiesel Glaswerke AG.

In the 1970s considerable expansion took place. In 1973 an area of about 100,000 m² was purchased in Zwiesel, on which a new plant was built. The annual turnover increased from 46 million DM in 1971 to 120 million DM in 1978. In 1979 the Schott Zwiesel Glaswerke AG employed about 1,900 workers and was one of Europe's largest cup glass manufacturers.

After further developments in the 1980s a steady decline in the number of jobs took place. In 2001 this number had fallen to 569, while turnover was still approximately 100 million DM.

== Products ==
Tritan is a type of so called unbreakable glass originally developed by Zwiesel Kristallglas in 2002 together with University of Erlangen–Nuremberg. Its name is derived from titanoxide (titanium oxide in English). In 2012, the Zwiesel Kristallglas company introduced Tritan Protect.

== Today ==
After a management buyout in 2001, the two managers Robert Hartel and Andreas Buske acquired the enterprise. This led to a radical reorganization with reduction of the assortment, the selling of stocks and properties, as well as a further reduction in the number of employees to approximately 400 workers. Renaming took place at the same time to "Zwiesel Kristallglas AG". Higher price segment catering and hotels were new areas of concentration. On 1 January 2006 the trademark rights for the traditional brand 'Jenaer Glas' were acquired.

In 2006 the enterprise was awarded the title "Turnaround of the Year" by restaurant magazine impulse and the BDO Deutsche Warentreuhand AG. In 2007 the Zwiesel Kristallglas AG was among the hundred winners of a competition for innovation, the "Top 100". Today the enterprise employs over 700 workers, approximately 500 in Zwiesel, and a turnover of over 70 million euro is expected.

In the grounds of Zwiesel Kristalglass, the highest crystal glass pyramid of the world (approx. 26 feet high), made from over 93,000 glasses, was unveiled on 25 May 2007.

== Literature ==
"Schott-Zwiesel. Die Geschichte einer Glashütte im Bayerischen Wald" Passavia, Passau, 1979

== See also ==
- Zwiesel Glass Queen
