= Superfest =

East German shatter-resistant glass

External videos
- Durability test of an antique Superfest glass compared to standard laboratory glassware.
- "This glass is indestructible (nearly)". NileBlue, June 2024.

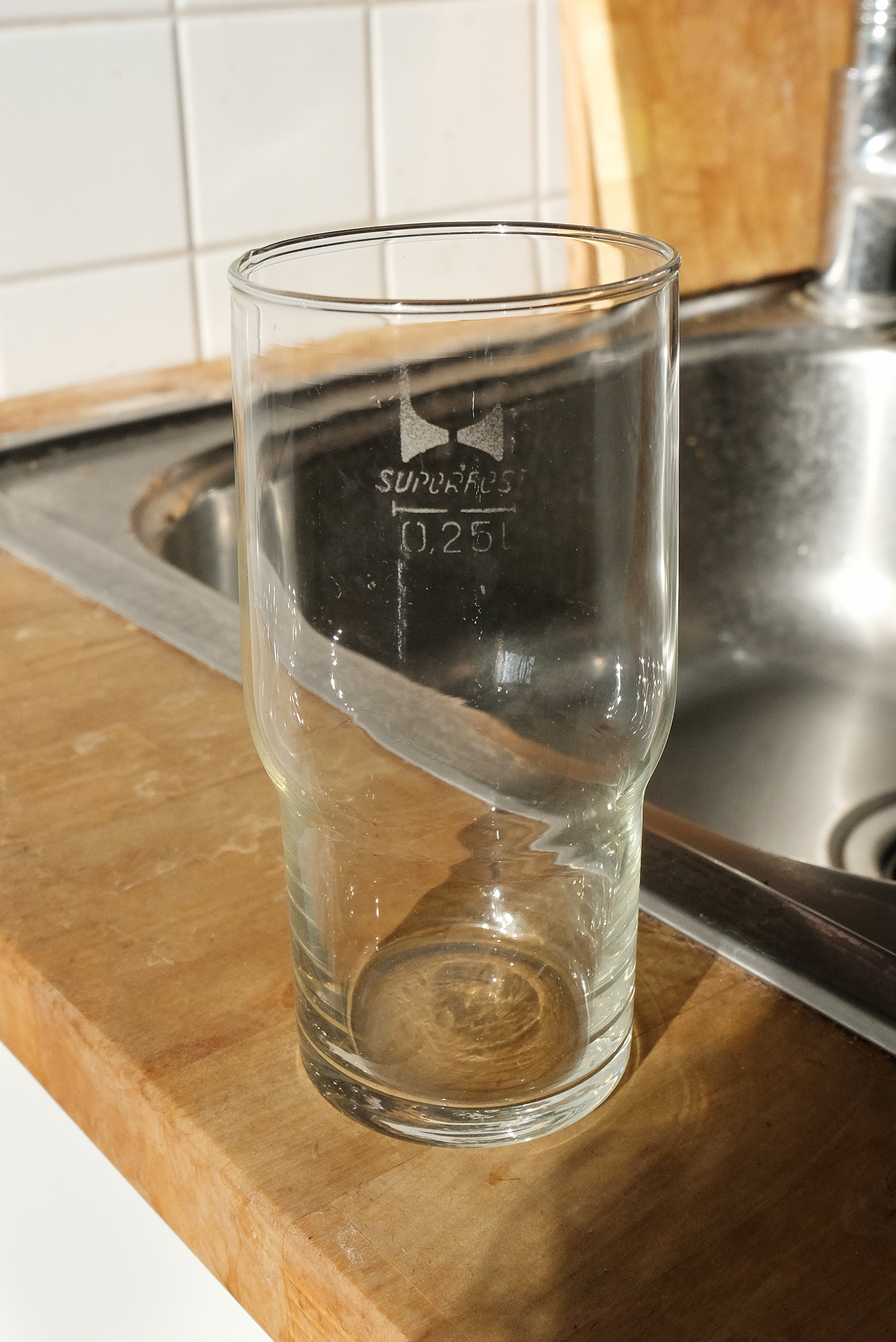
Branded Superfest glass

Superfest, also called CV-Glas or Ceverit until 1980, was a brand of drinking glasses from the German Democratic Republic (GDR). Due to being made of chemically strengthened glass, they were notably strong. The Superfest glasses were produced between 1980 and 1990 in what was then state-owned Sachsenglas Schwepnitz.

The GDR regarded the product as a key potential export and gave it priority for development. However, foreign sales were not secured, as potential buyers regarded the idea of long-life glassware as detrimental to their ability to sell replacements. As state employees in a state owned industry, the inventors did not receive significant financial rewards or royalties, but were honoured for their achievements.

Around 120 million glasses were sold by the end of production in 1990, mostly to food and drink establishments within the GDR. Designs included many glass sizes and ice cream cups.

== History ==
In the mid-1970s, attempts began in the GDR to make conventional thin-walled commercial glass stronger and more heat-resistant. The Glass Structure Research Department, founded in 1973 by the Central Institute for Organic Chemistry, investigated chemical strengthening by ion exchange. The technology was invented by Steven Kistler ca. 1962, further developed and soon commercialized by Corning. In an additional processing step, smaller sodium ions in the surface layer of the glass are replaced by larger potassium ions, which increases the tension in the glass surface, making it stronger. This technique is also used to make Gorilla Glass.

On 8 August 1977, a four-person team led by the scientist Dieter Patzig registered patent number 157966 Method and device for solidifying glass products by ion exchange for solidified drinking glass. In November 1978, a Council of Ministers decision secured the financing of this “project of particular urgency”. The glass brand resulting from the invention was called CEVERIT, composed of CE (chemical) + VER (solidified) + IT (usual ending for mineral substances). The aim was to have five times the lifespan of an ordinary drinking glass, but fifteen times lifespan was achieved. Other advantages included heat resistance, stackability, and lower weight.

The scientists commanded a small team of assistants who helped perfect the material. One of them, Elfriede Hilma Matzko, measured and reported cracks in the experimental glass. The scientists and their team of assistants from the GDR Academy of Sciences (AdW) received an honor and a cash reward for their innovation.

Production began in spring 1980 at Sachsenglas Schwepnitz and was initially limited to beer glasses. At the suggestion of the West German sales representative Eberhard Pook, the name of the brand was changed to Superfest. The total daily energy consumption of the system, which was designed for a throughput of up to 48,000 250 ml jars per day, was between 250 and 350 kWh. By the end of production on 1 July 1990, 110 to 120 million super-strength drinking glasses in all sizes were manufactured. The main customer was the hospitality sector in the GDR. The intended sale in the Federal Republic did not take place.

With Coca Cola, for example, they said: Why should we use a glass that doesn't break? We make money with our glasses. […] The dealers said understandably: Who would saw off the branch he was sitting on?

— Eberhard Pook

Shot glasses, vases, ice cream cups, and other shapes were later added to the range.

With the political change, the GDR glass industry and its scientific institutions began to be wound down. In July 1990, the Schwepnitz glassworks became SAXONIA-Glas GmbH Schwepnitz, which was liquidated by the Treuhand in 1991. In April 1992, the patent was abandoned by the inventors.

== Examples ==
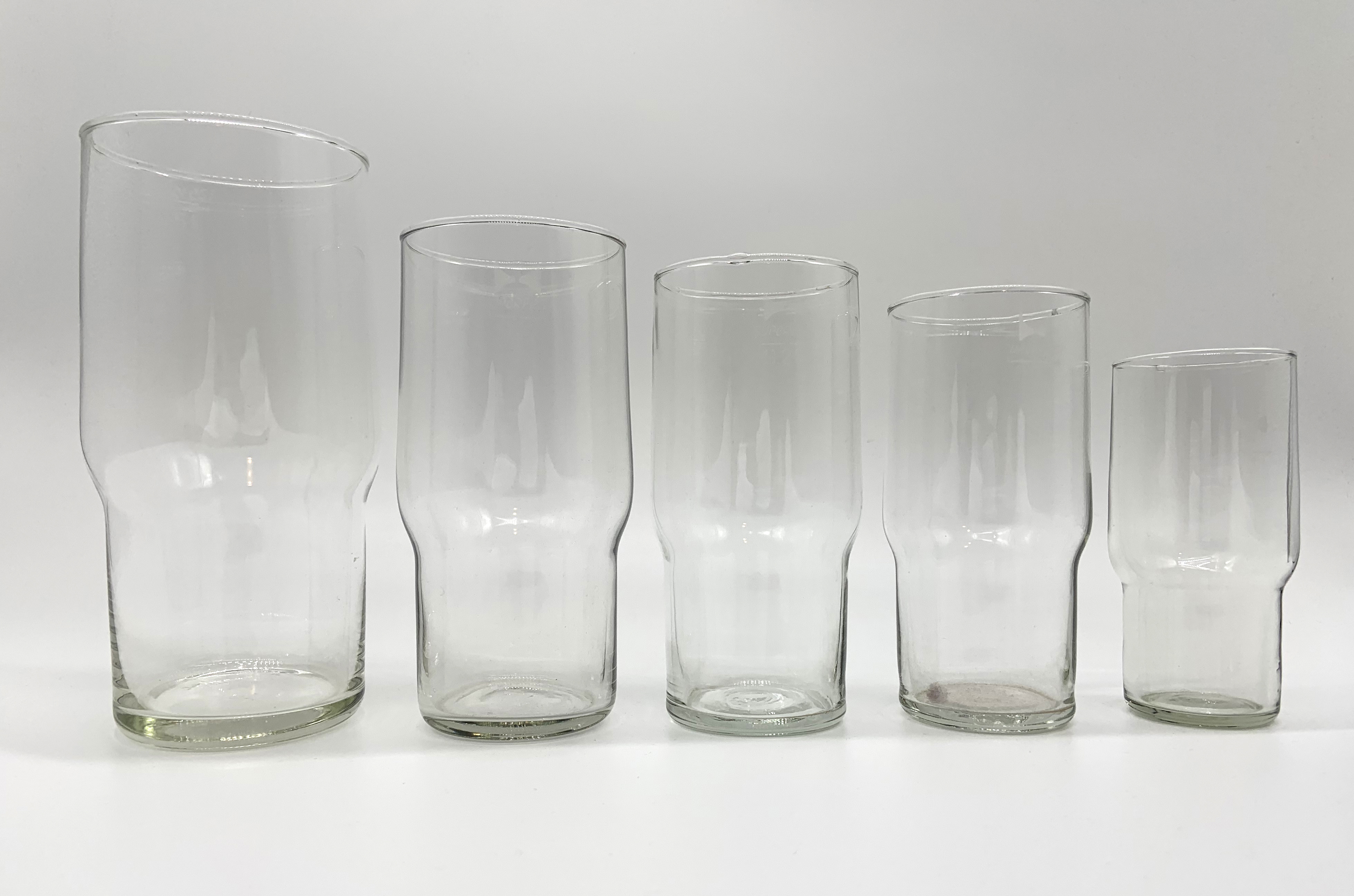
Superfest glasses in five sizes

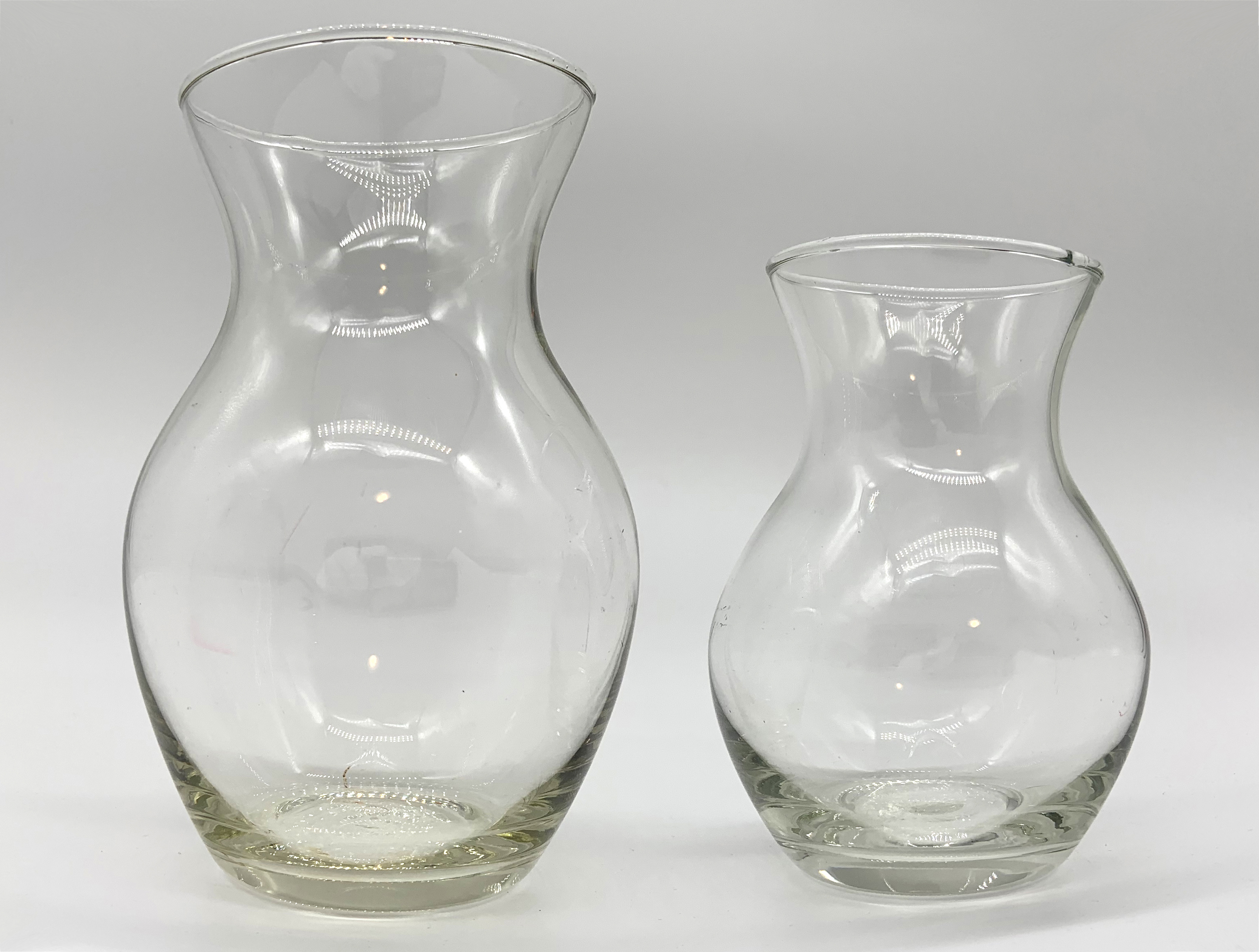
Superfest vase

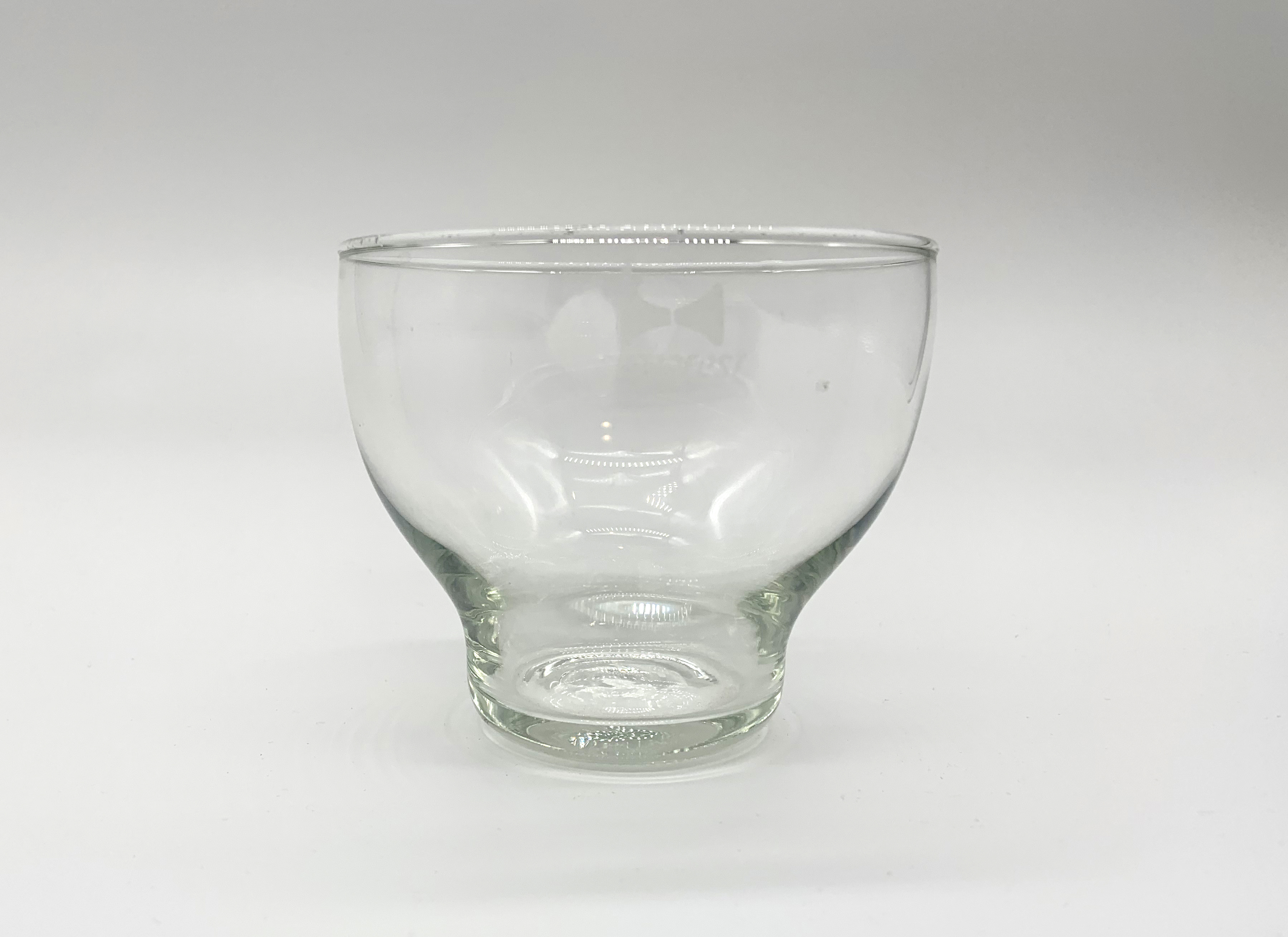
Superfest ice cream cup

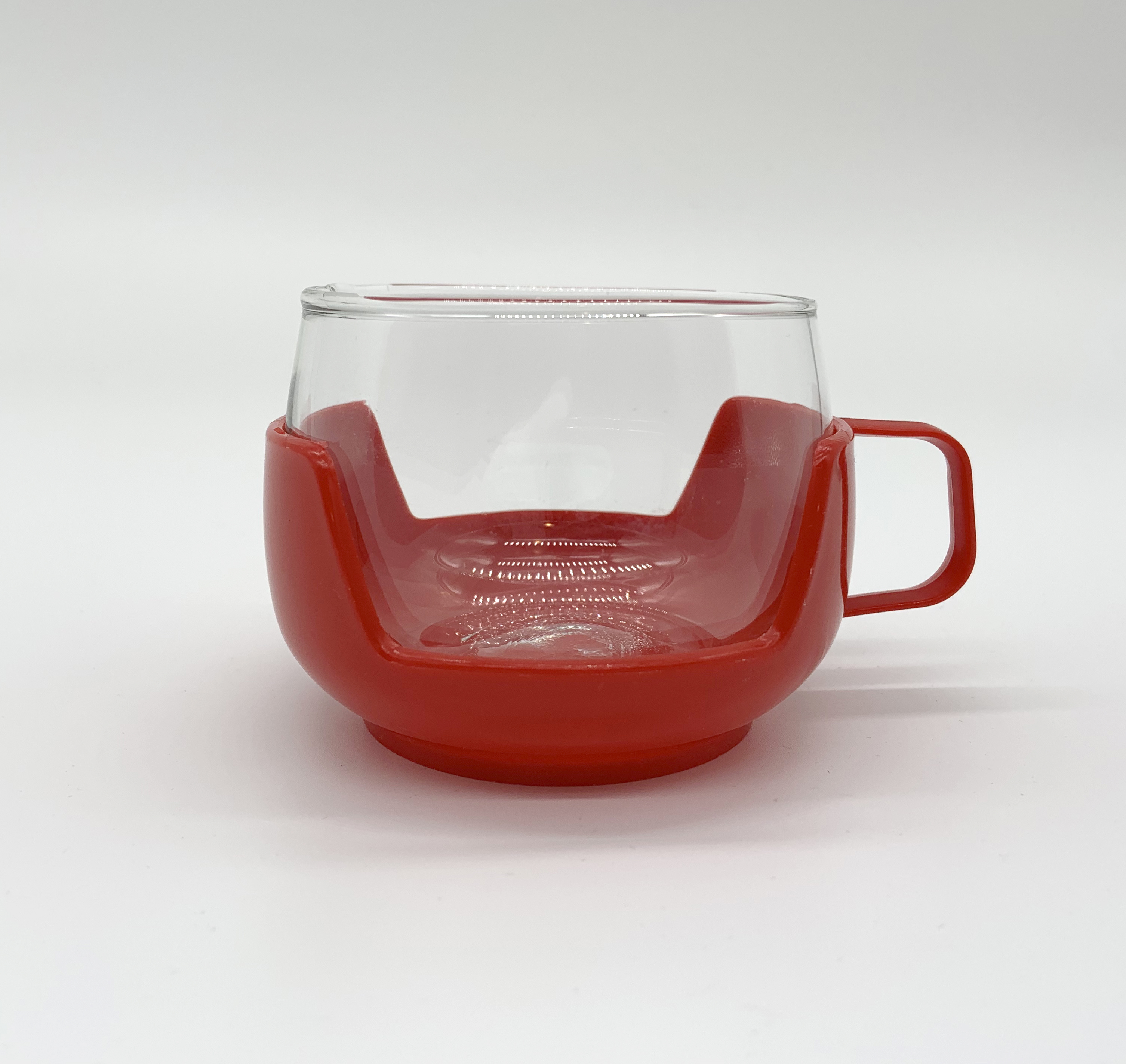
Superfest tea cup

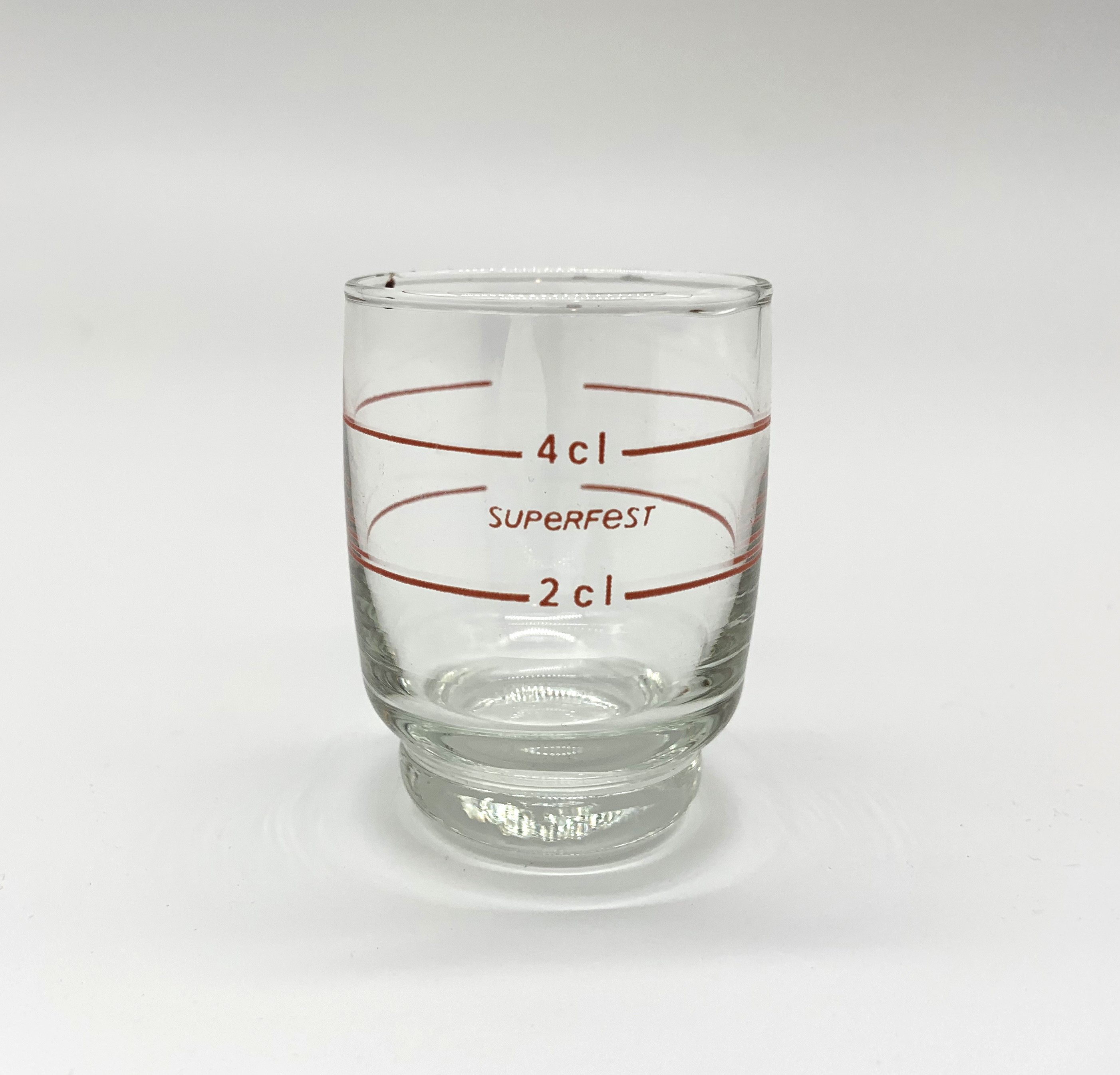
Superfest stamp with imprint

== See also ==
- Pyrex
- Jena glass
- Duralex
