= Steven Kistler =

American chemical engineer (1900–1975)

Samuel Stephens Kistler
- Born: March 26, 1900
- Died: November 6, 1975 (aged 75)
- Known for: Inventor of aerogels

Samuel Stephens Kistler (March 26, 1900 – November 6, 1975) was an American scientist and chemical engineer, best known as the inventor of aerogels, one of the lightest known solid materials.

== Biography ==
Kistler, the son of a shopkeeper, was born in the small town of Cedarville in the far northeastern corner of California. The family moved to the larger Santa Rosa when Kistler was 12, where he first became interested in chemistry. When he entered the College of the Pacific in 1917, however, his plan was to learn to play the cello, then pursue a degree in agriculture. Instead, he ended up taking every science course available, and after three years he moved to Stanford University and obtained a B.A. in chemistry, followed by a chemical engineering degree. He never did learn to play the cello. After a brief spell working for the Standard Oil Company of California, he returned to academia, teaching chemistry at the College of the Pacific until 1931, when he transferred to the University of Illinois.

=== Invention ===
The exact circumstances of the creation of the first aerogels are not well recorded. A popular story is that they resulted from a competition between Kistler and one Charles Learned "to see if they could replace the liquid inside of a jelly jar without causing any shrinkage". Whether these experiments were performed at the College of the Pacific, still with limited facilities following the move in 1924 to the new Stockton campus, or at Stanford, where Kistler began pursuing a doctorate in 1927, is a source of some confusion. Either way, in 1931 Kistler published a paper in Nature (vol. 127, p. 741) titled "Coherent Expanded Aerogels and Jellies".

He left his teaching post at the University of Illinois in 1935 and signed a contract with Monsanto Company in the early 1940s to start developing granular silica aerogel products under the trademark Santocel. Largely used as a flattening agent in paints and for similar uses, the line was discontinued by Monsanto in 1970, probably due to the high cost of manufacture and competition from newer products. Kistler had returned to teaching, however, taking up a position as Dean of the University of Utah College of Engineering in 1952.

=== Glass strengthening ===
In 1962 Kistler published an innovative paper on a new way of chemical strengthening of the glass by replacing the smaller sodium ions with larger potassium ones by ion exchange. The technology was further developed and soon commercialized by Corning, and it's now used in Gorilla Glass and similar products.

=== Death ===
He died in Salt Lake City in November 1975, shortly before the resurgence of interest in aerogels caused by the discovery of a less time-consuming method of manufacture by researchers led by Stanislaus Teichner in France.
