= Digital Fair Repair Act =

The Digital Fair Repair Act is a New York State law that ensures consumers and independent repairers the right to repair their consumer electronics. The law requires original equipment manufacturers (OEMs) of consumer electronics to provide parts, tools, manuals, and other information to consumers for the repair of these devices. It exempts motor vehicles (which are already covered by a Massachusetts law), home appliances, and medical equipment. The bill was signed into law by Governor Kathy Hochul on December 28, 2022, and it will apply to devices first used or purchased in the state on or after July 1, 2023. This law makes New York the first state in the United States to mandate a form of right to repair by consumers for electronic devices.

== History ==
The bill was introduced in April 2021. It was approved as Bill S4104A by the New York Senate on June 3, 2022, and previously as Bill A7006B by the New York Assembly.

It was signed by Governor Kathy Hochul on December 28, 2022, though the bill was amended following opposition of some of its parts by technology industry lobbyists. With the amendments, manufacturers are not required to provide passwords or tools for bypassing a device's security features. They can also offer assemblies of parts rather than individual parts "when the risk of improper installation heightens the risk of injury," potentially increasing prices and discouraging these repairs. Furthermore, this law will only apply to new electronic products manufactured or sold in New York State on or after July 1, 2023, and it excludes products sold only for commercial or government use.

== Reception ==
While initially acclaimed, the bill was met with mixed reception after Governor Hochul's last-minute amendments.

iFixit CEO Kyle Wiens, who was thrilled due to the bill finally being passed, said, “This is a huge victory for consumers and a major step forward for the right to repair movement. New York has set a precedent for other states to follow, and I hope to see more states passing similar legislation in the near future.” However, he criticized the lobbying that weakened the bill towards the end.

Right to repair activist Louis Rossmann was highly critical of the New York State legislature and Governor Hochul, accusing them of corruption, in a video he posted on YouTube after the passage of the bill. He had predicted the amendments in an earlier video.
