= International Repair Day =

Annual event in October

International Repair Day was established in 2017 to promote the value and importance of repairing, including at community events like Repair Cafés or Restart Parties. The event occurs annually on the third Saturday in October. The first International Repair Day was organised on 21 October 2017. The second International Repair Day took place on 20 October 2018. The 2018 event focused on the right to repair: the right to access information and resources needed for repair, and the need for products to be more durable, efficient and repairable.

International Repair Day is organised by the Open Repair Alliance, an international group of repair organisations collaborating to make electronic products more durable and easier to repair, including The Repair Cafe Foundation (Netherlands), The Restart Project (UK), iFixit, Anstiftung Foundation (Germany) and Fixit Clinic (United States).
