= Cabinet =

Cabinet or The Cabinet may refer to:

== Furniture ==
- Cabinetry, a box-shaped piece of furniture with doors and/or drawers
- Display cabinet, a piece of furniture with one or more transparent glass sheets or transparent polycarbonate sheets
- Filing cabinet, a piece of office furniture used to file folders
- Arcade cabinet, a type of furniture which houses arcade games

== Government ==
- Cabinet (government), a council of high-ranking members of government
- Cabinet, term used for government entities that report directly to the governor's office in the state of Kentucky, US
- War cabinet, typically set up in wartime

== Equipment ==
- A slotted screwdriver blade type
- 3D printer cabinet, encapsulation that can provide better control of the environment around a 3D printer
- Computer case
- Loudspeaker enclosure
- Serving area interface or telecoms cabinet

== Media ==
- The Cabinet (TV series), an Australian political program
- Cabinet (file format), a computer compressed file extension
- Cabinet (magazine), on art and culture
- Cabinet (album), by Spawn of Possession
- Milford Cabinet, a New Hampshire newspaper
- "Cabinet", a song by Spratleys Japs from Pony

== Other ==
- Cabinet (cigarette), a German brand of cigarettes
- Cabinet (room), an early private room
- Cabinet Room (White House)
- The Cabinet (professional wrestling), faction
- Coffee cabinet, a type of ice cream-based milkshake or frappe common in Rhode Island

== See also ==
- Cabinet card
- Cabinet Inlet
- Cabinet of curiosities
- Cabinet painting
- Cabinet projection
- Coffee cabinet
- List of national governments
