= Frosty (frozen dairy dessert) =

Frozen dessert sold by Wendy's

Wendy's Frosty
- Wendy's Monsters & Minions banana Frosty
- Alternative names: Wendy's Frosty
- Type: Frozen dairy dessert
- Course: Dessert
- Place of origin: Columbus, Ohio, U.S.
- Created by: Dave Thomas
- Serving temperature: Cold
- Main ingredients: Milk

The Frosty is a frozen dairy dessert of the American fast-food restaurant chain Wendy's. The Frosty was among the first five items introduced on the Wendy's menu.

Wendy's founder Dave Thomas created the original "light chocolate" Frosty according to a recipe from Fred Kappus by combining chocolate and vanilla flavors, as he thought that a pure chocolate flavor would overwhelm the taste of the restaurant's hamburgers. Thomas based the Frosty on the milkshakes he drank in Detroit as a youth, and created the Frosty to be thick enough to require a spoon to eat. The consistency has been described as between that of a milkshake and soft-serve ice cream.

== Specialty flavors ==
Over the years, Wendy's has occasionally introduced new Frosty flavor variations.

In August 2006, a vanilla Frosty flavor was introduced after repeated customer requests.

For both summer 2022 and summer 2023, the vanilla Frosty was temporarily replaced with a strawberry Frosty. In November 2022, Wendy's released a new peppermint Frosty for the holidays; this was the third new Frosty flavor released and temporarily replaced the vanilla Frosty. In September 2023, a pumpkin spice Frosty was introduced.

For spring 2024, an orange dreamsicle Frosty was introduced. For summer 2024, a triple berry Frosty was introduced. In fall 2024, a "pineapple under the sea" Frosty was released in honor of the 25th anniversary of SpongeBob SquarePants. This was followed by a "salted caramel" frosty in November.

For winter 2024, the vanilla Frosty was reintroduced after having been continuously supplanted by other flavors for a two-year period. Wendy's generally swaps out the vanilla Frosty flavor whenever a specialty Frosty flavor is launched, while always keeping the original signature chocolate Frosty flavor available.

On February 21, 2025, Wendy's introduced a "Thin Mints Frosty Swirl" in partnership with Girl Scouts of the USA, coinciding with the start of Girl Scout cookie season. It was a Frosty with a rich, minty cookie crumble sauce inspired by the Girl Scouts Thin Mints cookies. Wendy's brought it back along with the new "Thin Mints Frosty Fusion" on February 16, 2026.

On April 15, 2025, Wendy's introduced Frosty Swirls, where customers could choose to add caramel, strawberry, or brownie batter to their vanilla or chocolate Frosty. Less than a month later, on May 12, 2025, Wendy's introduced Frosty Fusions. Fusion flavors included Pop-Tarts Strawberry, Oreo Brownie, and Caramel Crunch. Each of these could top a chocolate or vanilla Frosty, at that point giving customers a total of 14 different Frosty options.

On August 4, 2025, Wendy's introduced a "Raven's Blood Frosty" as a tie-in with the television series Wednesday. It was a Frosty with either a chocolate or vanilla base with a black cherry syrup swirl.

On June 8, 2026, Wendy’s introduced a "Banana Frosty Swirl" featuring a banana cream sauce swirled into a vanilla base as a collaboration with Illumination's Minions & Monsters film.

== See also ==
- The Icee Company – American beverage company
- McFlurry – Frozen dessert produced and sold by McDonald's
- Shaved ice – Ice-based dessert
- Slurpee – Frozen beverage sold by 7-Eleven
- Slushy – Flavored frozen drink
