= McDonald's ice cream machine =

Ice cream machine used by McDonald's locations

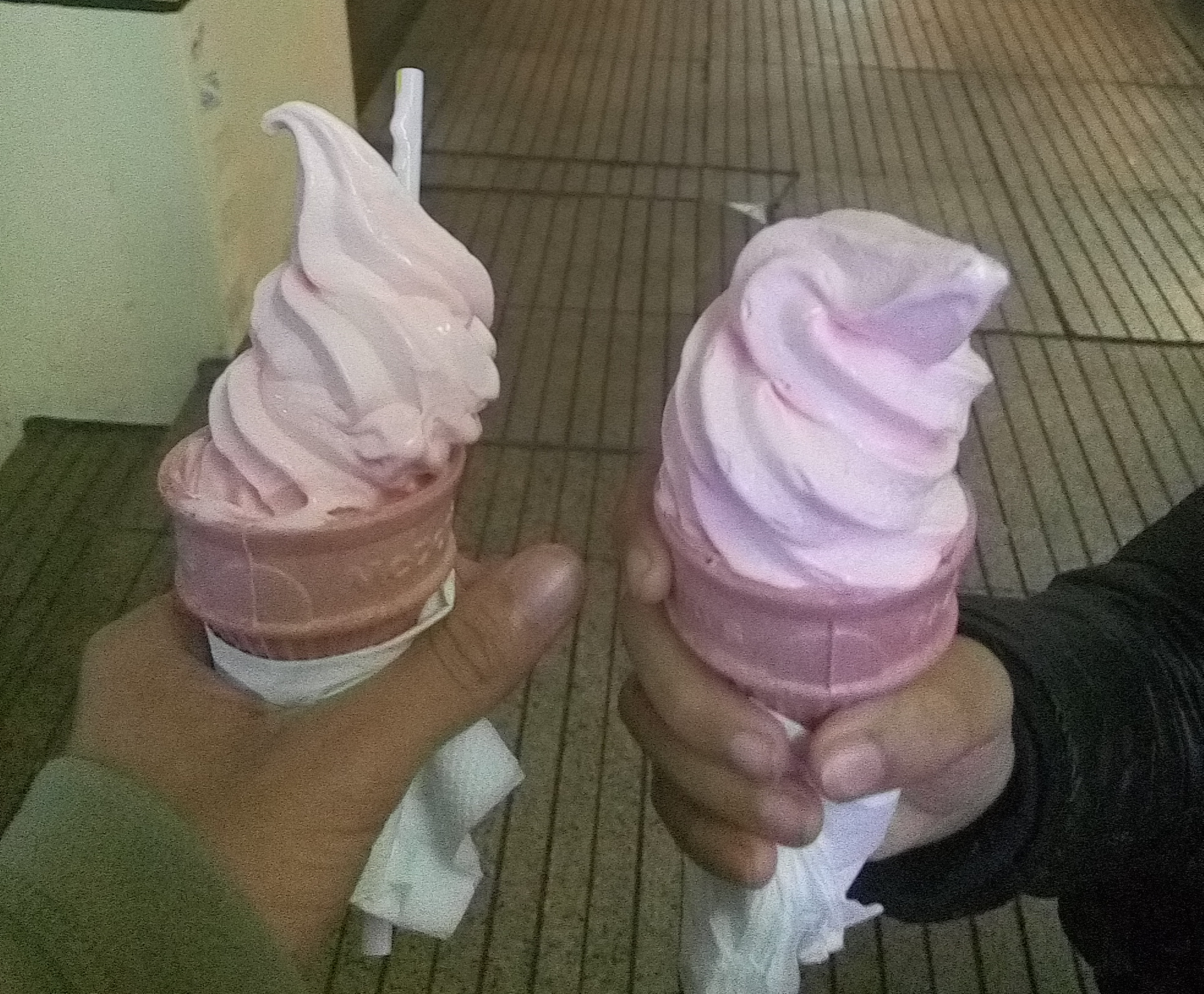
Peach Blossom soft serve ice cream served by McDonald's

The McDonald's fast food chain has used multiple ice cream machines at its various locations, but the chain has primarily operated those made by the Taylor Company. In 1956, Ray Kroc, who would soon become the founding owner-operator of the McDonald's franchise business, made a handshake agreement with the Taylor Company to supply milkshake machines for the fast food chain as its exclusive supplier. The two companies have continued to cooperate to the present day.

The most prominent of the machines is the Taylor C602, which is used in approximately 13,000 of the 40,000 McDonald's restaurants (as of 2021) and is notorious for reliability issues. In 2000, an internal McDonald's survey revealed that a quarter of restaurants were reporting that the machines were nonfunctional. The machine is used to produce both shakes (Note: In some markets including the United States, McDonald's, like many other restaurant chains, refers to its frozen dairy-based beverages as "shakes" rather than "milkshakes" for legal reasons.) and ice cream desserts, including soft serve cones, sundaes and McFlurries. (Note: A McFlurry is McDonald's vanilla-flavored soft serve ice cream in a cup with other ingredients mixed into it, such as caramel, M&M's candies, or crumbled fragments of Oreo or chocolate- and peanut-butter-flavored cookies.) In recent years, McDonald's has allowed franchisees to instead purchase ice cream machines made by Carpigiani.

== History ==
The equipment manual for the Taylor C602 used by McDonald's identifies it as a "combination shake and soft serve freezer" that is "manufactured exclusively for McDonald's" according to the Taylor Company. In March 2017, McDonald's began allowing franchisees to purchase other machines made by Carpigiani, saying that they are faster to clean.

Since 2019, Kytch has sold a device that intercepts the Taylor C602's internal communications to provide franchise owners with clearer error messages. Kytch was endorsed by Tyler Gamble, a prominent member of the largest conference of McDonald's franchises, the National Owners Association, in October 2020, leading to a surge in sales. However, after about 500 Kytch devices were purchased, McDonald's emailed franchise owners in November 2020 to instruct them to remove the Kytch devices immediately, citing safety risks that could lead to "serious human injury", the leak of "confidential information" and Taylor Company warranty violations. The email promoted upgrading the machines to versions with Taylor Company's new "Taylor Shake Sundae Connectivity" user interface feature, which offered capabilities similar to the Kytch product's capabilities, to substitute for the Kytch device.

In a lawsuit against Taylor, Kytch claimed that Taylor had copied aspects of the Kytch device when developing its "Connectivity" feature and was sabotaging Kytch's business. Kytch also sued McDonald's for its actions to promote Taylor's competing product and prohibit the use of Kytch's device. Kytch's request for an injunction against Taylor's new "Connectivity" feature was denied, as the judge concluded there was no evidence that Taylor's system "was built with or incorporates any Kytch trade secret".

== Machine design and maintenance ==
The Taylor C602 freezes ingredients in spinning barrels, pulls sheets of the mixture off the sides of the barrels using scraping blades and mixes the sheets to create the ice cream. The ice cream is pushed out through nozzles. The Taylor C602 uses two hoppers and two barrels and uses a pump to push the ice cream out of the system. Taylor C602 machines are equipped with a display screen. A menu displaying the viscosity of the ingredients, the temperature of the glycol (used in the pasteurization process), and the machine's error messages is accessible by inputting a sequence of numbers.

The Taylor C602 is prone to bacterial contamination. Taylor machines and their ice cream mixture contents are heated daily to 151 °F (66 °C) to pasteurize them and are then refrozen—a process that takes about four hours. Preparing for the cleaning cycle requires employees to create and use a sanitizing mix and rinse the parts. If the device is unplugged during the process or an incorrect amount of mixture is placed in the hoppers, the process will typically be repeated. When the machine fails to work properly, it can be difficult to determine why, and the typical procedure is to simply repeat the pasteurization process to see if the problem goes away.

Taylor is the only company authorized to fix Taylor C602s. Repairs account for a quarter of Taylor's sales, and it can take weeks for a technician to arrive on site to address the problem. Taylor Company also makes a different model called the C709, which operates similarly.

In October 2024, the United States Copyright Office approved an exemption to the Digital Millennium Copyright Act for bypassing copyright restrictions to allow for repair of commercial food preparation equipment, which would cover the Taylor ice cream machines. DMCA Sec. 1201 Part 2 prohibited franchisees from buying services to help.

== Reception and reputation ==
The McDonald's version of the Taylor C602 is notorious for reliability issues, and has since become an internet meme. iFixit identified overheating issues when creating liquid ice cream or shutting down the machines completely and accused Taylor of maliciously writing vague error codes to increase repair sales. In 2000, an internal McDonald's survey reported that a quarter of restaurants' machines were nonfunctional.

In 2017, three women attacked a McDonald's employee in Florida after learning that the machine was broken, leading to support from some Internet users. The McDonald's Twitter account referenced the reliability of the machines in August 2020, joking that the company had a "joke about our soft serve machine" but worried that "it won't work".

Avatar of McDonald's

McDonald's
(@McDonalds)
tweeted:

we have a joke about our soft serve machine but we're worried it won't work

August 11, 2020

In October 2020, the independently operated website McBroken was launched to track whether the ice cream machine at every McDonald's is currently working or not, displaying the status on a map of the locations. The site operates by using the McDonald's online ordering system to submit a request for an ice cream sundae at each location every thirty minutes, and then checking whether the order is accepted or rejected as currently unavailable. The website was endorsed by McDonald's US vice president of communications, David Tovar, who tweeted that "Only a true @McDonalds fan would go to these lengths to help customers get our delicious ice cream!" The site later partnered with Jack in the Box to advertise them as an alternative to McDonald's in 2022.

In July 2021, the Federal Trade Commission began a preliminary investigation into Taylor over device repair and diagnostics restrictions as part of a Biden administration push for right-to-repair legislation. In October 2024, the US Copyright Office granted a copyright exemption allowing franchisees to repair retail-level food preparation equipment, including McDonald's ice cream machines.
