= Coffee milk =

Drink made from coffee syrup and milk

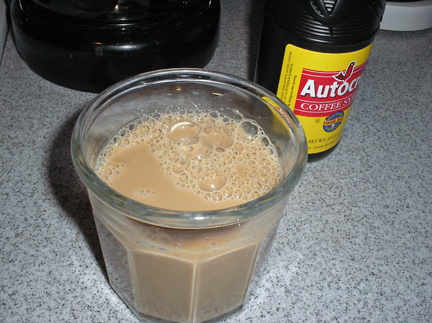
- Type: Flavored milk
- Place of origin: United States
- Region or state: New England
- Associated cuisine: Rhode Island
- Main ingredients: Milk, coffee syrup
- Similar dishes: Chocolate milk

Coffee milk is a drink made by mixing coffee syrup or extract with milk, in a manner similar to chocolate milk. Since 1993, it has been the official state drink of the U.S. state of Rhode Island.

== History ==
While the precise origin of coffee milk is unclear, several sources trace it back to the 19th century Italian immigrant population in Providence, Rhode Island. In the late 19th and early 20th centuries, approximately 55,000 Italian immigrants traveled to Providence, introducing their traditions and customs to Rhode Island; this included drinking sweetened coffee with milk, which is believed to have led to the creation of coffee milk.

Coffee milk originated in American diners and soda fountains in the early 20th century. The first coffee syrup is thought to have been created by a soda fountain operator who sweetened leftover coffee grounds with milk and sugar to create a syrup, then mixed it into glasses of milk. In the 1930s, coffee milk was regularly served at pharmacy lunch counters, targeted toward children and youth as an alternative to the hot coffee served to their parents.

Due to the popularity of the product, coffee syrup was eventually bottled and sold by merchants. The first merchant to bottle and sell coffee syrup was D. Abelsen & Son who created an Arabian Brand Coffee Syrup in Grant Mills, Cumberland, Rhode Island. The product was first documented in the 1926 Ice Cream Trade Journal published by Thomas D. Cutler. The syrup was advertised as “Our New Creation Arabian Brand Coffee Syrup for Ice Cream Topping, Milk Shakes, Iced Coffee, Etc.” D. Abelsen & Son set up production at their factory at 556 North Main Street in Providence.

To honor the heritage of this local beverage which originated in Rhode Island's Blackstone Valley, the Blackstone Valley Tourism Council markets its own version of coffee syrup (in collaboration with Dave's Coffee).

Silmo Packing Company of New Bedford, Massachusetts began producing coffee syrup in 1932. And in 1938, Warwick, Rhode Island’s Eclipse Foods produced its own version. Lincoln, Rhode Island's Autocrat Coffee began producing coffee syrup in the 1930s. Coffee Time was produced by a New Hampshire-based producer around the same time. In 1963, Eclipse Foods and Coffee Time were purchased by Globe Extracts of Hauppage, New York. In the 1990s, Autocrat acquired Eclipse and Coffee Time, produced all three brands, and came to dominate the coffee syrup market.

Autocrat is claimed to be the most popular brand of coffee syrup in Rhode Island. Newer brands such as Dave's Coffee and Morning Glory offer coffee syrups with desired customer qualities, such as no high-fructose corn syrup or artificial colors.

In 1993, the Rhode Island General Assembly opted to change Rhode Island's state drink, with the two potential choices being coffee milk and Del's Lemonade. Coffee milk ultimately triumphed, and was officially named the state drink on July 29, 1993.

== Coffee syrup ==
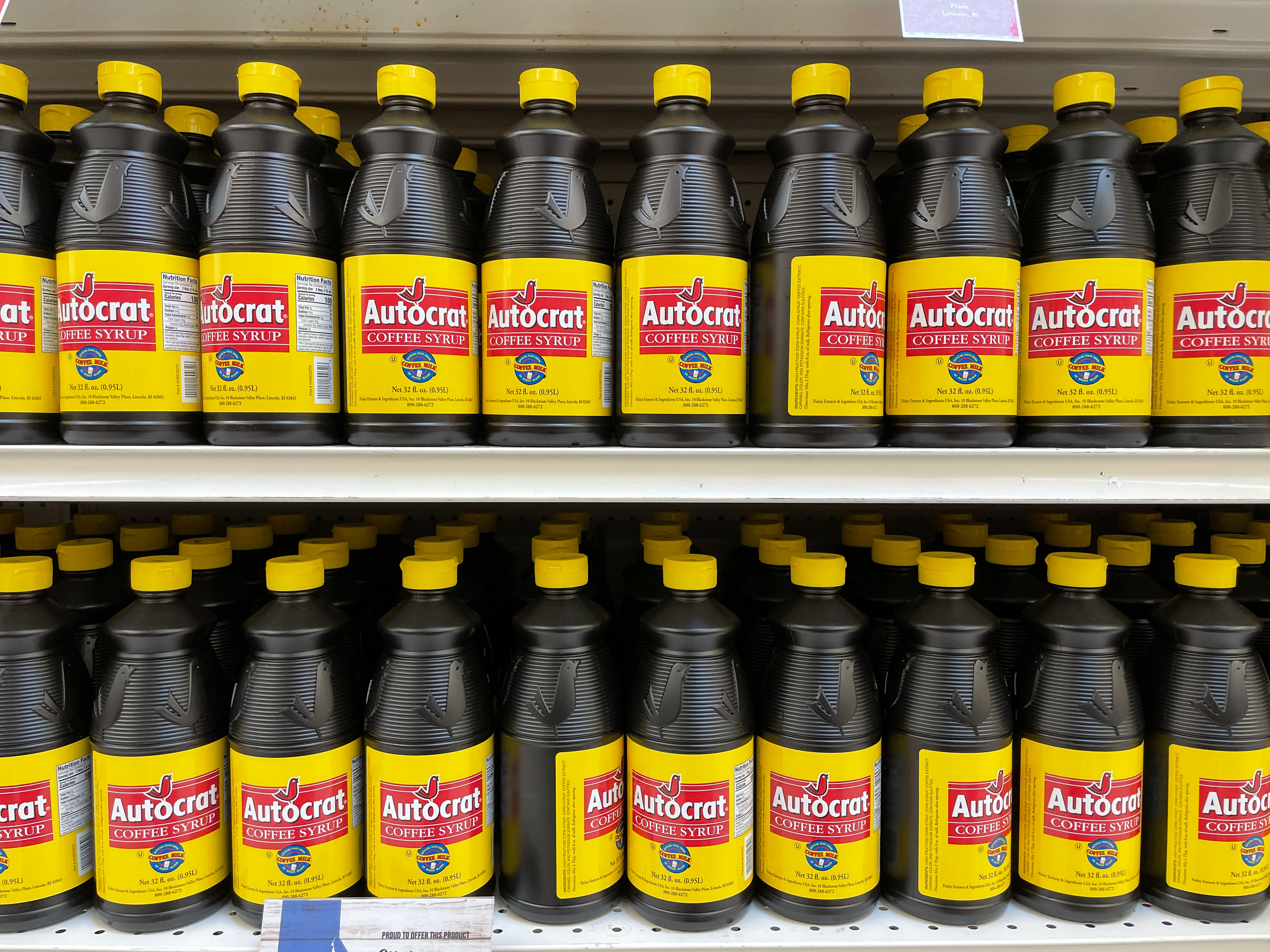
Bottles of coffee syrup

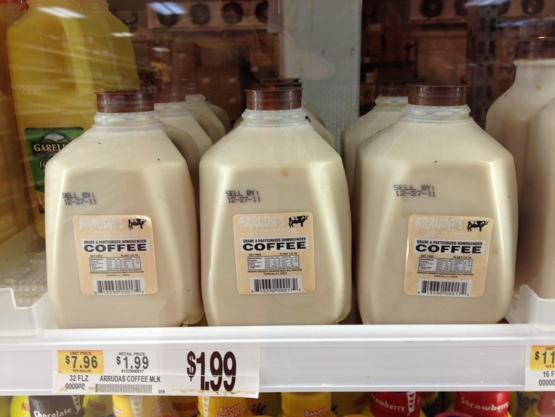
Prepared coffee milk in a supermarket dairy case

Coffee syrup is a sweetened coffee concentrate and is a key ingredient in coffee milk.

Coffee syrup is produced by straining hot water and sugar through coffee grounds. It can also be prepared by preparing a large amount of hot coffee and then adding sugar to it afterward. A cold-process method for coffee syrup involves soaking pulverized coffee beans for some time and then adding sugar.

Coffee syrup is often brewed at home, in a saucepan using coffee and sugar.

== Related foods ==
A coffee cabinet is an ice cream-based milkshake-style beverage found almost exclusively in Rhode Island and southeastern Massachusetts, consisting of coffee ice cream, coffee syrup, and milk.

In December 2013, the Narragansett Brewing Company partnered with Autocrat Coffee to market a limited edition "coffee milk stout".

In summer 2015, Warwick Ice Cream collaborated with Autocrat to produce coffee milk ice cream.

== See also ==
- Camp Coffee
- Coffee sauce
- Egg cream
- Farmers Union Iced Coffee
- Iced coffee
- List of coffee beverages
- List of regional beverages of the United States
