= Autocrat (disambiguation) =

An autocrat is the ruler who holds absolute power in the government.

Autocrat may also refer to:

- Autokrator, a Greek epithet applied to an individual who exercises absolute power, unrestrained by superiors
- Auster Autocrat, a 1940s British single-engined three-seat high-wing touring monoplane
- Autocrat, LLC, a company based in Rhode Island, United States
- The Autocrat of the Breakfast-Table, a collection of essays written by Oliver Wendell Holmes, Sr.
- The Autocrats, a Finnish political satire TV series
