= Repair Café =

Venues where people gather and repair everyday items

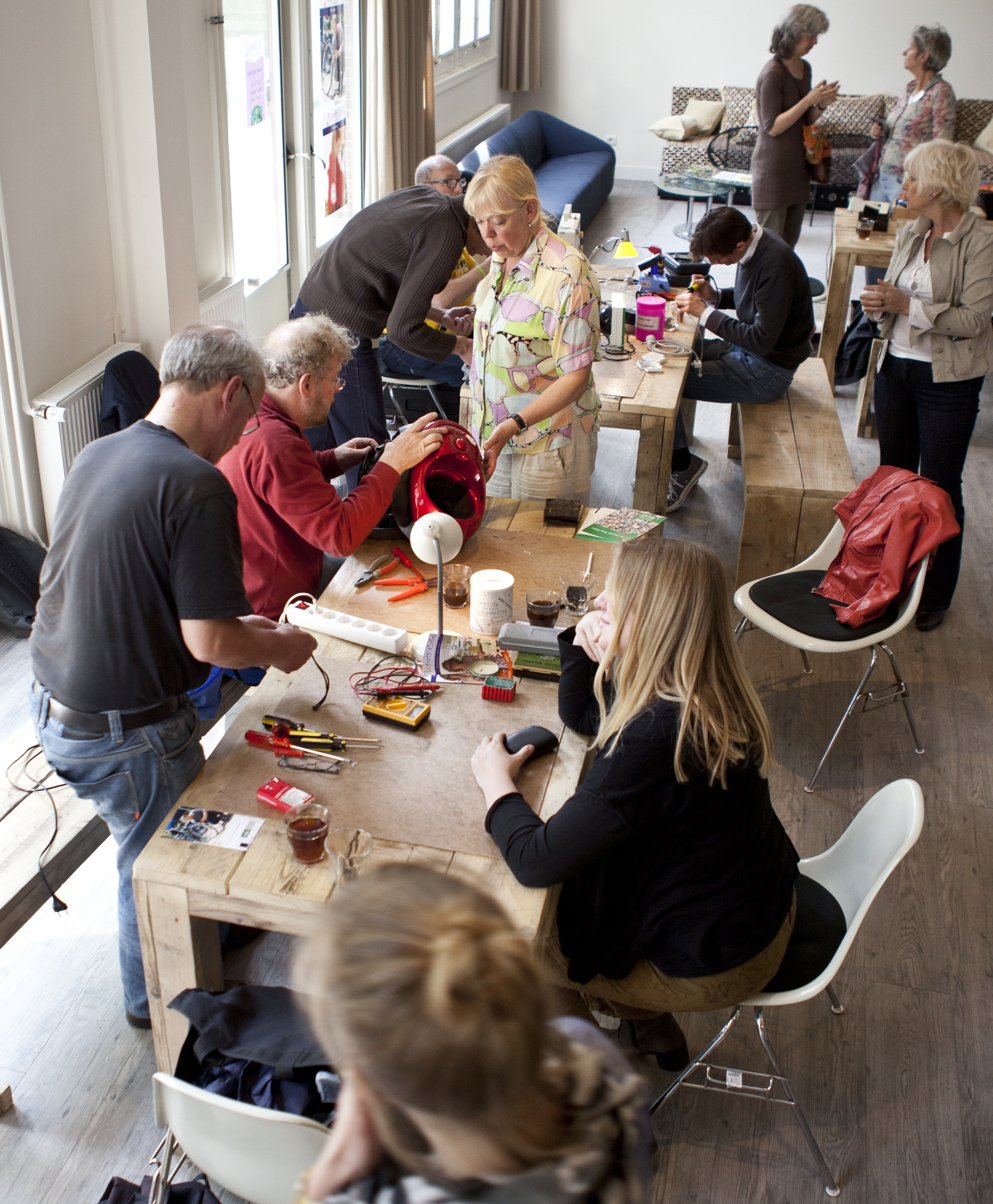
Repair Café Amsterdam-West

Repair Café is an organisation with venues set up to provide people with a place to work on repairing objects of everyday life, such as electronics, mechanical devices, computers, bicycles, and clothing. Repair Cafés are typically held at community locations, including churches, libraries, and college campuses where tools are available and device owners can fix their broken goods with the help of volunteers. Repair Café is a part of a grassroots movement that aims to reduce waste, overconsumption, and planned obsolescence. The movement promotes 'do-it-yourself ' (DIY) and 'do-it-together' approaches to repair while fostering community engagement.

== History ==
In 2009, Martine Postma, a Dutch journalist, launched the first Repair Café in Amsterdam as a local sustainability initiative. On 18 October 2009, the first Repair Café was held at Fijnhout Theater, Amsterdam-West. On 2 March 2010, the Repair Café Foundation was set up. The foundation was formed to support local groups around the world in setting up their own Repair Cafés. Subsequently, the number of Repair Cafés expanded globally . In March 2016 Postma registered more than 1,000 Repair Cafés worldwide, 327 in the Netherlands, 309 in Germany, 22 in the UK, 21 in the US, 15 in Canada, 4 in Australia and 1 in India. In 2019, the Guardian estimated 1300 around the world. The Repair Café Foundation estimated the number of Repair Cafés had exceeded 2000 in 2021. As of October 2025, more than 3818 Repair Cafés are available to visit.

In 2017, the first International Repair Day was announced. It is an annual event held on the third Saturday of October.

== Knowledge sharing ==
In 2017, the Repair Café Foundation developed an online tool—RepairMonitor—enabling volunteers to collect and share knowledge about repair data via the database. The data follows the Open Repair Data standard, logging key information such as product category, brand, product age, the fault experienced, the repair attempted, the repair status and if the repair was not successful, what was the reason for the repair failure. As of October 2025, over 305,649 repairs are available in the open repair database.

== 3D printing of broken parts ==
Some Repair Cafés have begun to use 3D printers for replicating broken parts. Broken pieces of domestic appliances may be able to be pieced or glued back together, after which they can be scanned with a 3D scanner. Examples of 3D scanners include David Starter-Kit, 3D Systems Sense, MakerBot Digitizer, Fuel 3D, Microsoft Kinect, and Asus Xtion. (Note: Microsoft Kinect and Asus Xtion can be used together with ReconstructMe software for 3D scanning) Once the physical object is scanned, the 3D model is rendered. It can be converted to a .stl or .obj format and revised using geometry processing software such as makeprintable, netfabb, MeshLab, Meshmixer, Cura, or Slic3r. (Note: Cura and Slic3r have some fixup tools, despite being mainly a slicer program) It is printed using a 3D printer client, creating a physical part using the 3D printer. The entire process takes some time to complete.

== See also ==
- Bicycle cooperative
- Circular economy
- Consumer Rights Act 2015
- Hackerspace
- iFixit
- Library makerspace
- Low technology
- Magnuson–Moss Warranty Act
- Men's shed
- Right to repair
- Sharing economy
- Tool library
- Upcycling
