= Repairability =

Ease of fixing a product defect

The creation of products that can be repaired, and reduce prices for sustainable products is widely supported by European, American and Chinese respondents in the 2020–2021 European Investment Bank Climate Survey.

Repairability is a measure of the degree to and ease with which a product can be repaired and maintained, usually by end consumers. Repairable products are put in contrast to obsolescence or products designed with planned obsolescence.

Some private organizations and companies, mostly affiliated with the right to repair movement, assign repairability scores to products as a way of communicating to consumers how easily reparable the product is.

== French repairability index ==
Since 2021, some smartphones, laptops, televisions, washing machines, lawnmowers and other electronic devices sold in France have been required to report a repairability index (French: Indice de réparabilité) which rates how repairable a product is on a scale from 0 to 10, primarily to prevent corporate greenwashing and encourage environmental transparency. Products are evaluated on 5 key areas: documentation, disassembly, spare parts availability, spare part pricing, and product specifics. The French scorecard took inspiration from iFixit's scorecards and intends to expand its efforts to rate overall durability in addition to repairability.

=== Limitations ===
The repairability index scoring process is not bulletproof, though—manufacturers currently self-report their indices to regulatory bodies with little to no government oversight ensuring the index was properly calculated. For example, smartphone and laptop manufacturers can obtain an extra point on the index just by providing consumers with information regarding security or software updates.

=== Effects ===
Since France's recently enacted legislation requiring repairability indices, some positive effects have materialized. For instance, Samsung now offers consumers a free online repair manual for its Galaxy S21+ in an attempt to boost its repairability index. The enforcement of French repairability index laws pushed Samsung to release this manual, something consumers had been requesting for a long time; in contrast, there is no English repair manual for American consumers, as U.S. legislation doesn't incentivize Samsung to release such a manual. This French legislation has applied pressure to tech corporations to increase the repairability of their products and transition to a far more circular economy.

=== Notable score ===
At launch, the average repairability score has hovered around 5.4 out of 10. Apple's iPhone 12 models scored a 6.0 and its iPhone 11 models scored a 4.5 out of 10 on the repairability index scale; the 2021 MacBook Air scored a 6.5 and the 2021 MacBook Pro scored a 5.6 on the scale. Google's Pixel 4a scored a 6.3.

== See also ==
- Availability, that a device has the ability to function when needed
- Circular economy, oroduction model to minimise wastage and emissions
- Design life, time the creator plans a product to last
- Electronic waste, discarded electronic devices
- Interchangeable parts, practically identical components
- Maintainability, ease of maintaining a functioning product or service
- Product lifetime, time span from when a product is sold to when it is discarded
- Repairable component, hardware component that can be repaired
- Service life, time period where an object can fulfill a function
- Throw-away society, society strongly influenced by consumerism
