= Eric Lundgren =

American businessperson

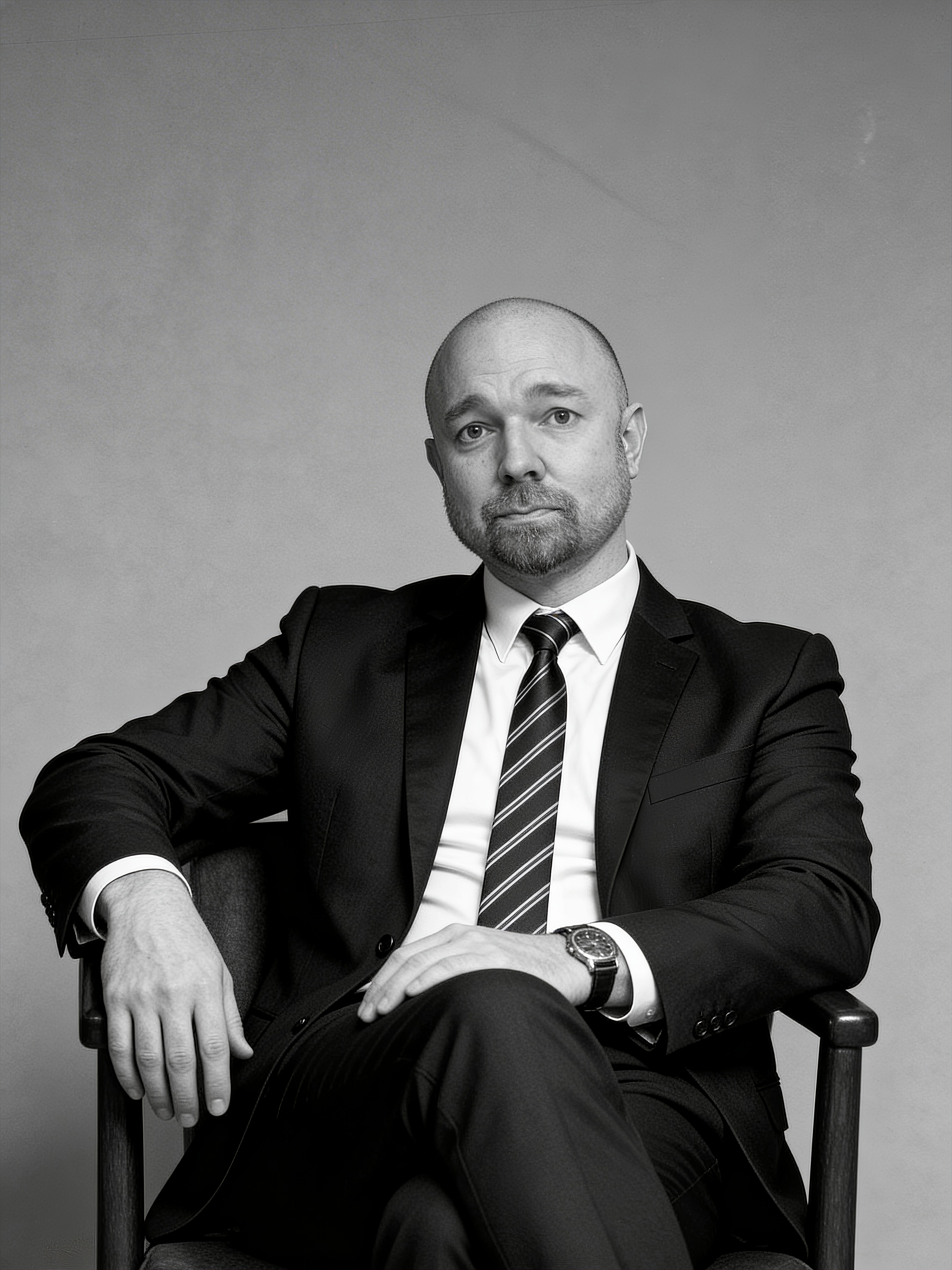
- Lundgren in 2026
- Born: Lynden, Washington, US
- Occupations: Social Entrepreneur, Innovator
- Years active: 2002-present
- Known for: Electronic Waste Recycling, Lithium-Ion Batteries, Global Philanthropy, Electronics right to repair

Clifford Eric Lundgren is an American businessperson best known for recycling electronic waste and developing lithium-ion battery solutions. He is the CEO of BigBattery, a UL-Certified Grid-Tied battery energy storage system company in the United States. He was the COO of MiningSky and Founder of IT Asset Partners, Inc. (ITAP), an electronics reuse and hybrid recycling company.

Lundgren is an advocate for the right to repair movement. In 2017, Lundgren served a year in prison after pleading guilty to copying 28,000 Microsoft restore discs that he intended to use in recycled computers. Media attention surrounding his sentencing helped charge the right to repair movement, which advocates for building a society that repairs and reuses as much as possible. This response led to support from the White House and The President of the United States, resulting in an Executive Order, asking the FTC to increase consumers' ability to repair equipment on their own. His story was the focus of a 2019 Vice Media production which covered his legal situation in detail.

During the COVID-19 pandemic, he donated $2.6M worth of alcohol wpes, millions of masks, hazmat suits, and nitrile gloves to frontline workers. Lundgren sent 34 mobile generators to local hospitals to power their parking lot triage centers.

At the 8th Annual Wharton DC Innovation Summit on July 14, 2022, Eric Lundgren received the Benjamin Franklin Innovation Award, recognized as an American leader in Sustainable Battery Innovation.

== Early life and education ==
Lundgren was born and raised in Lynden, Washington, where at a young age began recycling computers from a local bank. He graduated with a Bachelor of Science in Entrepreneurial Studies from Babson College.

== Career ==
=== Recycling companies ===
In 2002 Lundgren moved to Los Angeles, and started his first electronics recycling company, Environmental Computer Associates (ECA), where he worked with a number of large companies including American Airlines. He served as the CEO of the company until 2010, before selling to Access Computer Products Inc. (acquired by Waste Management Inc.)

In 2006 Lundgren traveled to China and lived there for five years learning about electronic recycling and finding ways to send cheap parts to America to prolong the lifecycle of electronics. Upon returning to the US, Lundgren founded IT Asset Partners, Inc. in late 2012. The company repurposed enterprise and consumer electronics, lithium-ion batteries, harvested generic parts and components, and recycled e-waste for technology companies.

Lundgren said, "95 percent of a computer, such as the battery and the circuits, are generic and can be reused or repurposed." He devoted much time to recovering discarded batteries, whether from electric cars or computers, and reusing them in wheelchairs, electronics, and various vehicles. In 2009, Lundgren founded Source Captain Inc. in order to help American buyers bypass the broker process to source direct certified factories on a global scale.

Lundgren launched the first "electronic hybrid recycling" facility in the United States, which turns discarded cell phones and other electronics into functional devices, slowing the stream of harmful chemicals and metals into landfills and the environment.

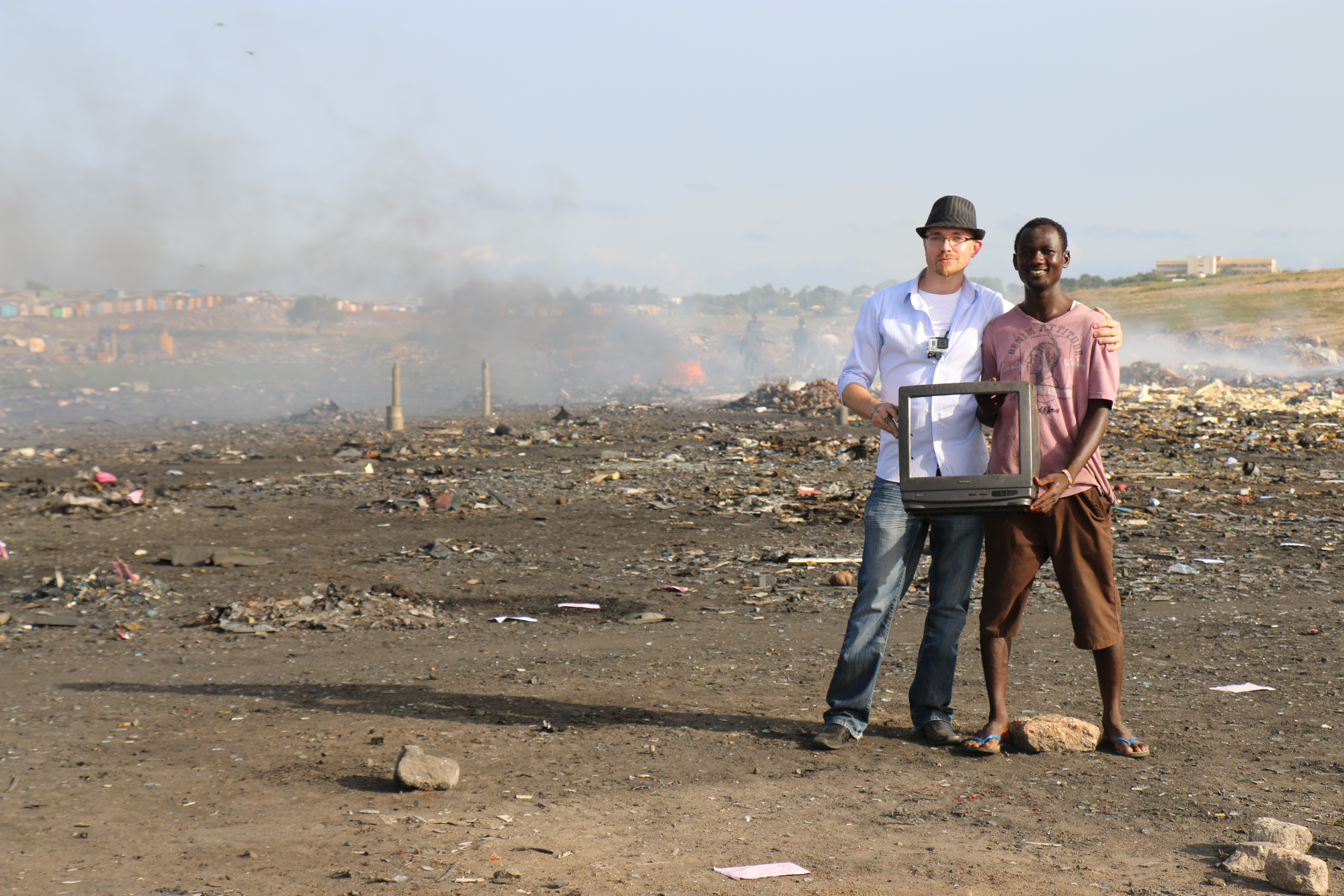
Lundgren in Ghana on clean up e-waste project

=== Philanthropy ===
In 2014, Lundgren was an honorary guest of President John Dramani Mahama, Lundgren lived in Accra, Ghana and worked with the President to solve the country's eWaste epidemic, providing new tools and solutions for eWaste Processing. He received awards from the GIPC and Ghanaian EPA for his solutions leading to the eWaste clean-up of Agbogbloshie, Accra: one of the most toxic places on earth.

In 2016, IT Asset Partners, Inc. undertook an initiative where it repaired and donated more than 14,000 cellphones for "Cellphones for Soldiers", to benefit US soldiers deployed overseas.

During the COVID-19 pandemic, Eric imported and donated $2.6M worth of alcohol wipes to communities. He and his team also imported and donated tens of millions of masks, more than 150,000 hazmat suits, and over 40 million nitrile gloves to frontline workers in the American healthcare system. He and his team set up dozens of solar-powered trailers to keep hospitals up and running in the Greater Los Angeles area.

=== Other projects ===
In 2017, Lundgren converted a salvaged BMW known as "The Phoenix" to an electric vehicle, modifying it with 90% recycled parts to become the world's most efficient electric vehicle with a Guinness Book World Record distance of 999.5 miles on a single charge. The Phoenix has also surpassed Elon Musk & Tesla Model S P100D's world record of 1083 km (673 miles) on a single charge by traveling 1,203 km (748 miles) on real California highways and streets at freeway speeds and in stop-and-go conditions, averaging 52 miles per hour.

Lundgren has been featured as an honorary speaker at several events regarding eWaste and his work with PIRG, Right to Repair, and The President of the United States to pass an Executive Order in support of Right to Repair.

== Legal issues ==
While living in China from 2006 to 2011 one of his Source Captain projects was to manufacture replacement "restore disks". The restore discs are usually supplied by computer-makers as a way for users to reinstall Windows with preinstalled drivers to a hard drive if it crashes. The disks can be used only on a computer that already has a license for the Windows Operating System.

As COO of IT Asset Partners, Inc., Lundgren produced and shipped 28,000 restore discs to a broker in Florida in 2012. Their plan was to provide the discs to used-computer buyers who wouldn't have to take the time to create the discs themselves.

US Customs intercepted a shipment of the restore disks imported from China in 2012 and referred the case to federal prosecutors. Federal prosecutors filed a 21 count indictment against Lundgren for copyright violations of the Microsoft operating system. Initially, federal prosecutors valued the discs at $299 each, or the cost of a brand new Windows operating system, and Lundgren's indictment claimed he had cost Microsoft $8.3 million in lost sales.

Lundgren and his defense team disagreed with the charges and stated he was providing replacement restore discs for convenience to people using recycled hardware that already had a license to use the Windows operating system. Lundgren also stated Microsoft gave away the restore disk for free so there was nothing to steal and there were no lost sales.

Lundgren pled guilty to criminal trademark infringement and conspiracy to traffic in counterfeit Dell disks, and in May, a judge for the US District Court in the Southern District of Florida sentenced him to 15 months in prison, three years of supervised release, and a $50,000 fine.

Following his sentencing, Lundgren stepped down as CEO of IT Asset Partners, Inc In June 2017.

In April 2018, a federal appeals court in Miami rejected his claim that the "restore disks" he made to extend the lives of computers had no financial value, and instead ruled that he had infringed Microsoft's products, valuing the restore disks at $700,000 based on the $25 value Microsoft charged refurbishers for replacement licenses, which are bundled with a restore disk.

US Public Interest Research Group defended Lundgren, issuing a statement over his sentencing through its right to repair campaign.

Lundgren was released after serving one year of his fifteen-month sentence for good behavior.
