= Martine Postma =

Promoter of the Repair Café concept

- Born: 1970 (age 55–56)
- Occupations: Environmentalist, journalist
- Known for: Creating the Repair café

Martine Postma (born 1970) is a Dutch environmentalist and former journalist. She is best known for introducing the concept of the Repair Café.

== Early career ==
Postma worked as a journalist, for example at the De Groene Amsterdammer. She first wrote about higher education and then turned to sustainability and the environment.

She also wrote a guide for the Amsterdam district Oost-Watergraafsmeer with tips on how to throw away less rubbish.

== Repair Café ==
After she had her second child, Postma started to notice how many things people in the Netherlands threw away instead of trying to fix. She decided to start a project which would help people mend their broken things. This became the first Repair Café which opened in Amsterdam in 2009.

Postma then set up the Repair Café International Foundation to empower local communities to set up their own projects, fielding enquiries from Australia, Belgium, France, Germany, Poland, South Africa and Ukraine. She wrote a manual and produced a starter kit.

The DOEN Foundation gave the project a grant of over $260,000 in its social cohesion program, begun after the assassinations of Pim Fortuyn (2002), and Theo van Gogh (2004). This enabled Postma to employ a staff of three women.

In 2026 there were over 2,500 Repair Cafés <https://www.repaircafe.org/en/about/> in 35 countries, with 30 in Canada, 75 in the United States and 450 in the Netherlands.

In 2015, Postma published a book called Weggooien? Mooi niet! (English: Throw it away? Better not!) about the process of setting up Repair Cafés.

== Law reform ==
Whilst still involved in Repair Cafés, Postma has also joined a group lobbying the European Union to increase taxes on raw materials, which would then make repairing something a more attractive option than buying it new.

== Awards ==
- Amsterdam-West gave Postma the Wijkideeprijs in 2010.
- Dutch newspaper Trouw put Postma in its 'Sustainable 100' list for four consecutive years between 2012 and 2015.
- Nationale Postcode Loterij gave Postma an award in 2013.
- The 2022 Leopold Kohr Prize

== Books ==
- Weggooien? Mooi niet! [Throw it away? Better not!] (in Dutch). Amsterdam: Samenwerkende Uitgevers Vof. 2015. ISBN 9789490298067..
