= Coffee cabinet =

Coffee milkshake from Rhode Island

A coffee cabinet is an ice cream-based milkshake popular in Rhode Island consisting of coffee ice cream, coffee syrup, and milk. The ingredients are mixed in a drink blender or milkshake blender.

Among the famous Rhode Island creameries which serve them are Delekta Pharmacy in Warren, and the Original Vanilla Bean in South Kingstown. Newport Creamery, a chain of family restaurants found almost exclusively in Rhode Island, serve a variation of cabinets made with ice milk under the brand name "Awful Awful". A cabinet is often referred to elsewhere in New England as a frappe.

The earliest known reference to the Coffee Cabinet was published in The Spatula in 1903:

A drink that has become the most popular is "Coffee Cabinet," consisting of coffee syrup, egg, plain cream, ice cream, and shaved ice, thoroughly shaken. The coarse stream of soda is drawn and the drink is strained. This has often been called a meal in itself.

As with downcity, the etymology of this term is unknown. One common, but unsubstantiated, explanation is that the soda jerk or pharmacist kept the coffee syrup in one of the polished wooden cabinets behind the counter. It has also been theorized by some that the name was a variation on a drink known as the Royal Cabinet, an egg cream first popularized in Chicago.

== See also ==
- Autocrat, LLC
- Coffee milk
- Frappé coffee
