= Milkshake =

Cold dairy beverage

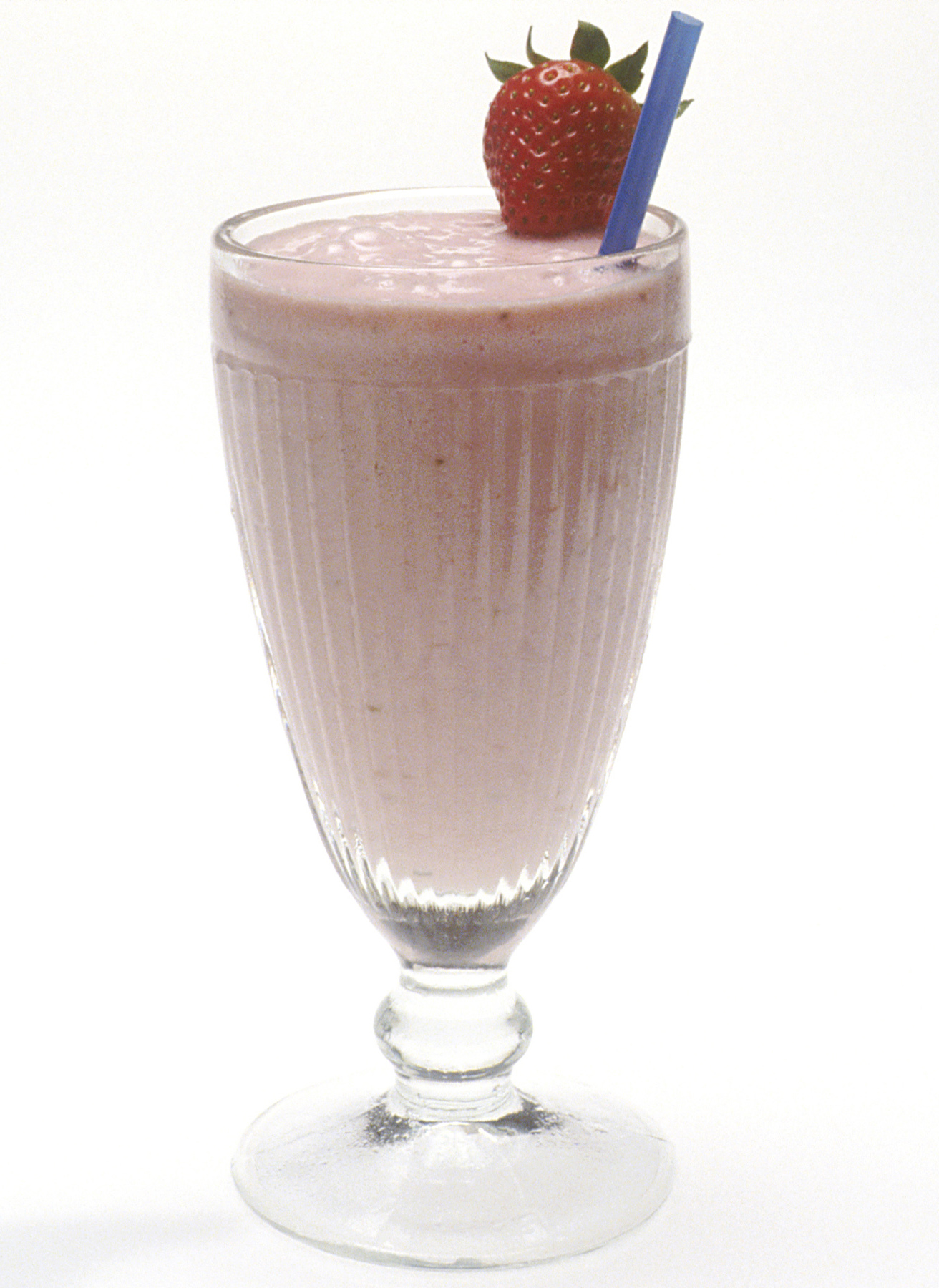
- A strawberry milkshake topped with a strawberry
- Alternative names: Thick shake, frappe, cabinet
- Type: Beverage
- Place of origin: United States
- Main ingredients: Milk, ice cream, and flavorings or sweeteners

A milkshake (sometimes simply called a shake) is a sweet beverage made by blending milk, ice cream, and flavorings or sweeteners such as butterscotch, caramel sauce, chocolate syrup, or fruit syrup into a thick, sweet, cold mixture. It may also be made using a base made from non-dairy products, including plant milks such as almond milk, coconut milk, or soy milk. Dry ingredients such as whole fruit, nuts, seeds, candy, or cookies are sometimes incorporated.

Milkshakes originated in the United States around the turn of the 20th century and gained widespread popularity after the introduction of electric blenders in the following decades. During this period, ice cream shops became popular social gathering spots for young people, and milkshakes came to symbolize the simplicity and innocence of youth culture.

== Preparation ==
Full-service restaurants, ice cream shops, soda fountains, and diners usually prepare the shake in a milkshake machine. At home, a blender is more commonly used. Milkshakes can also be mixed by hand using a spoon. Milkshakes may be made from any flavor of ice cream; additional flavorings, such as chocolate syrup, malt syrup, or malted milk powder, are often added prior to mixing.

Many fast food outlets do not make shakes from the individual ingredients; rather, they use automatic milkshake machines which freeze and serve a pre-made milkshake mixture consisting of milk, a sweetened flavoring agent, and a thickening agent. These are similar to soft-serve ice cream machines, but they keep the shake at a drinkable consistency.

== Terminology ==
Terminology around the distinction between a milkshake that uses ice cream and other forms of flavored milk varies regionally. An ice cream-based milkshake may be called a thick shake to distinguish it. In parts of New England and eastern Canada, the name frappe (/fræp/ FRAP) is used, with the term milkshake sometimes reserved for shaken milk drinks without ice cream; in Rhode Island specifically, they may be called cabinets, as in the "coffee cabinet". A milkshake containing malted milk powder is sometimes called a malt. The term concrete is used for particularly thick milkshakes that do not spill when turned upside down, such as those offered by the restaurant chain Culver's.

In some jurisdictions there are legal requirements about what can be called a "milkshake", such as requirements for the percentage presence of milk fat and non-fat milk solids. Because of this, it is common for restaurants to avoid using the term "milkshake" to refer to their products, such as simply calling them "shakes" rather than "milkshakes". Fast food restaurants that do not refer to their similar products as "milkshakes" include Wendy's (which calls their product a "Frosty"), Burger King, Dairy Queen, Del Taco, McDonald's, Shake Shack, and Sonic Drive-In.

== History ==
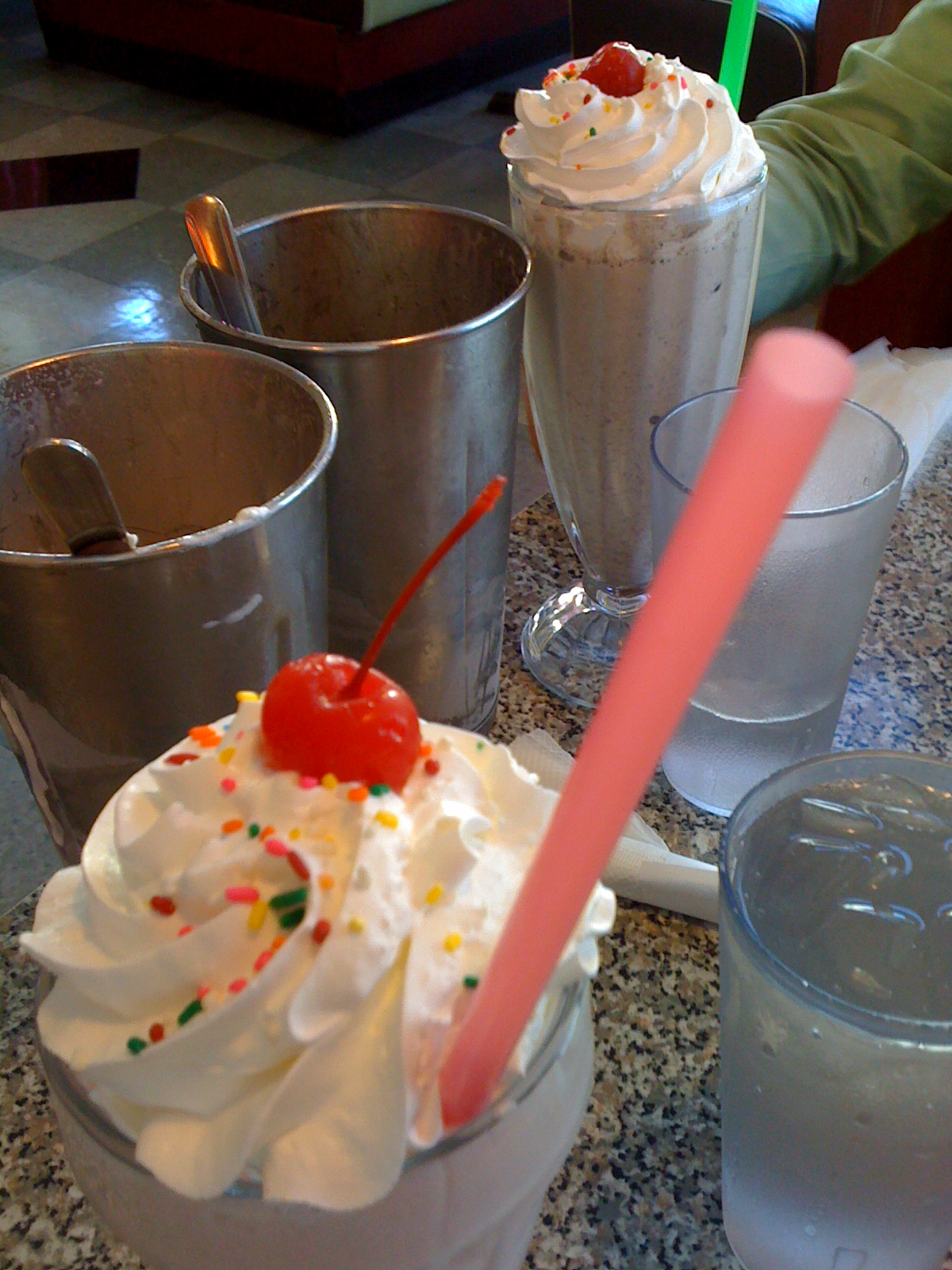
A strawberry and a chocolate shake, each topped with whipped cream, sprinkles, and a maraschino cherry

=== 1880s–1930s ===
When the term milkshake was first used in print in 1885, a milkshake was an alcoholic whiskey drink that has been described as a "sturdy, healthful eggnog type of drink, with eggs, whiskey, etc., served as a tonic as well as a treat". However, by 1900, the term referred to "wholesome drinks made with chocolate, strawberry, or vanilla syrups". By the "early 1900s people were asking for the new treat, often with ice cream". By the 1930s, milkshakes were a popular drink at malt shops, which were the "typical soda fountain of the period".

The histories of the electric blender, malted milk drinks, and milkshakes are interconnected. Before the widespread availability of electric blenders, milkshake-type drinks were more like eggnog, or they were a hand-shaken mixture of crushed ice and milk, sugar, and flavorings. Hamilton Beach introduced its Cyclone Drink Mixer in 1911, and it was widely used in soda fountains.

The Hamilton Beach design, with the motor on top, remains the most common kind of milkshake machine. In 1922, Steven Poplawski invented the bottom-motor blender, which is sometimes used for making milkshakes. With the invention of the blender, milkshakes began to take their modern, whipped, aerated, and frothy form.

The use of malted milk powder in milkshakes was popularized in the US by the Chicago drugstore chain Walgreens. Malted milk powder – a mixture of evaporated milk, malted barley, and wheat flour – was invented by William Horlick in 1897 for use as an easily digested restorative health drink for disabled people and children, and as an infant's food. However, healthy people soon began drinking beverages made with malted milk simply for the taste, and malted milk beverages containing milk, chocolate syrup, and malt powder became a standard offering at soda fountains. In 1922, Walgreens employee Ivar "Pop" Coulson made a milkshake by adding two scoops of vanilla ice cream to the standard malted milk drink recipe. This item, under the name "Horlick's Malted Milk", was featured by the Walgreen drugstore chain as part of a chocolate milkshake, which itself became known as a "malted" or "malt" and became one of the most popular soda-fountain drinks.

The automation of milkshakes developed in the 1930s, after the invention of freon-cooled refrigerators provided a safe, reliable way of automatically making and dispensing ice cream. In 1936, inventor Earl Prince used the basic concept behind the Freon-cooled automated ice cream machine to develop the Multimixer, a "five-spindled mixer that could produce five milkshakes at once, all automatically, and dispense them at the pull of a lever into awaiting paper cups".

Newspaper articles from the late 1930s suggest the term 'frosted' was sometimes used to refer to milkshakes, particularly those made with ice cream. In 1937, the Denton Journal in Maryland stated that "For a 'frosted' shake, add a dash of your favorite ice cream." In 1939, the Mansfield News in Ohio stated that "A frosted beverage, in the vernacular, is something good to which ice cream has been added. Example par excellence is frosted coffee –that hot, tasty beverage made chilly with ice and frosty with ice cream."

=== 1940s–1950s ===
By the 1950s, popular places to drink milkshakes were Woolworth's "5 & 10" lunch counters, diners, burger joints, and drugstore soda fountains. These establishments often prominently displayed a shining chrome or stainless steel milkshake mixing machine.

These establishments made milkshakes in Hamilton Beach or similar styles of drink mixers, which had spindles and agitators that folded air into the drinks for "smooth, fluffy results" and served them in 12 1/2-US-fluid-ounce (370 ml) tall glasses with bulbous top. Soda fountain staff had their own jargon, such as "Burn One All the Way" (chocolate malted with chocolate ice cream), "Twist It, Choke It, and Make It Cackle" (chocolate malted with an egg), "Shake One in the Hay" (a strawberry shake), and a "White Cow" (a vanilla milkshake).

Milkshakes had also become popular in other parts of the world, including the United Kingdom and Australia. In Australia, milk bars had grown popular and milkshakes were normally served lightly whipped and often in the aluminum or stainless steel cups in which they were prepared. In addition to more traditional flavors, spearmint and lime-flavored milkshakes became popular in Australia.

=== 2000s–present ===
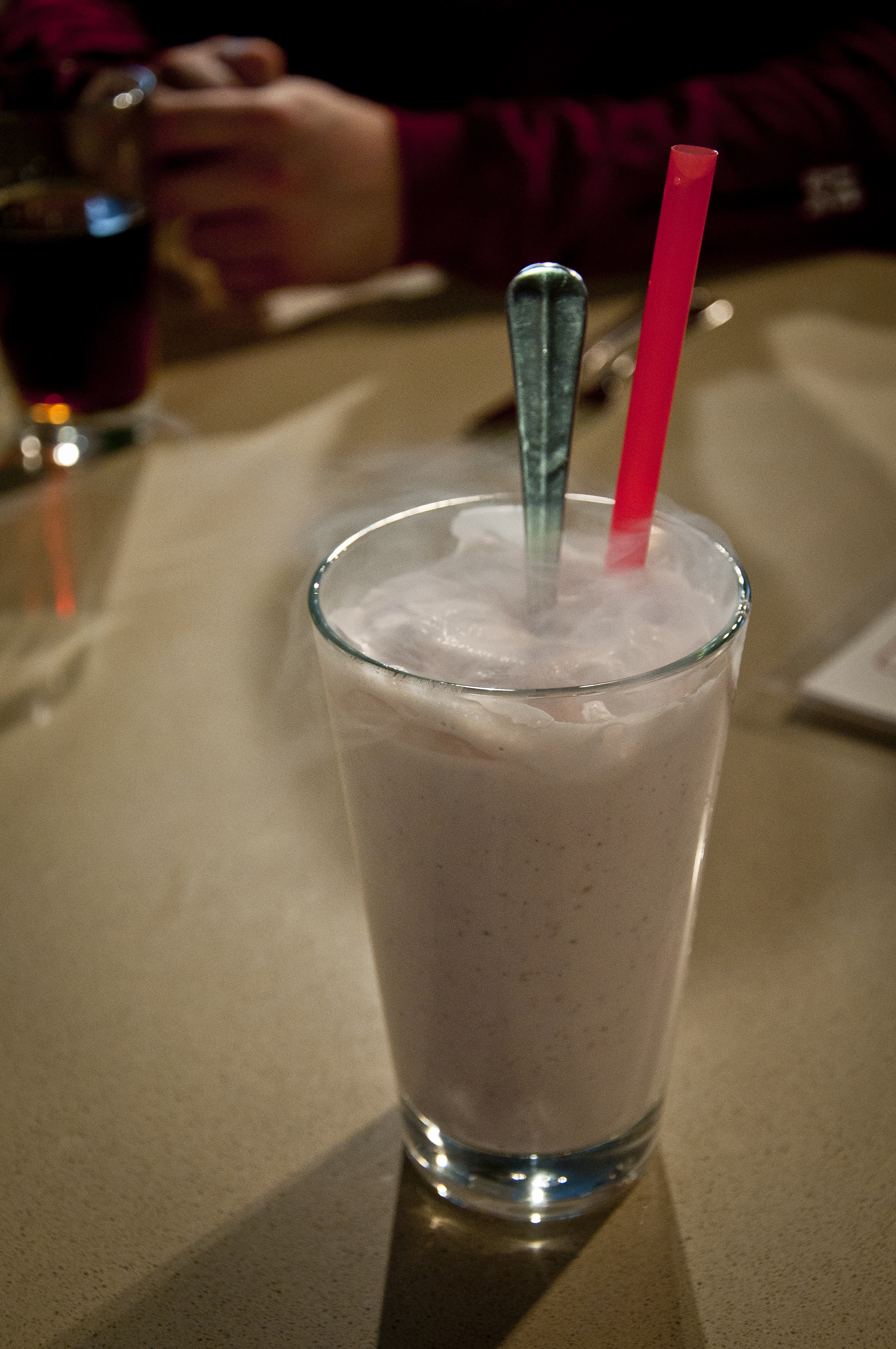
This milkshake was made using liquid nitrogen. Vapor can still be seen forming at the top.

In 2006, the U.S. Agricultural Research Service developed reduced-sugar, low-fat milk shakes for lunch programs. The shakes have half the sugar and only 10% of the fat of commercial fast-food shakes. Schools need a milk shake machine or soft-serve ice cream machine to serve the milkshakes. The milkshakes also have added fiber and other nutrients and reduced levels of lactose, which makes the shakes suitable for some people with lactose intolerance.

U.S. sales of milkshakes, malts, and floats rose 11% in 2006, according to the industry research firm NPD Group. Christopher Muller, the director of the Center for Multi-Unit Restaurant Management at Orlando's University of Central Florida said that "milkshakes remind us of summer, youth – and indulgence", and "they're evocative of a time gone by". Muller stated, that milkshakes are an "enormously profitable" item for restaurants, since the drinks contain so much air. The market research firm Technomic states that about 75 percent of the average-priced $3.38 restaurant shake in 2006 was profit. An executive from Sonic Drive-In, a U.S. chain of 1950s-style diner restaurants, calls shakes "one of our highest-volume, revenue-producing areas".

A 2016 article stated that chefs are trying out innovative ideas with milkshakes to keep customers interested in the drinks. The article noted that coffee-flavored shakes are popular "because it complements both sweet and savory" dishes. Another trend is using different types of milk, such as almond milk, coconut milk, soy milk, or hemp milk.

The mid 2010s saw the invention of the freakshake, a type of milkshake decorated with a large amount of toppings. Freakshakes became popular on social media platforms such as Instagram for their visual appeal, but attracted criticism from health campaigners due to their high sugar and calorie content.

== Use in protests ==
In May 2019, during the build-up to the EU parliament elections in the United Kingdom, the throwing of milkshakes emerged as a protest tactic, usually targeting right-wing politicians. The movement originated with the "milkshaking" of Tommy Robinson, with a second thrown later that month.

The UK police requested that an Edinburgh McDonald's refrain from selling milkshakes on May 17 during a visit by Nigel Farage. This prompted Burger King to tweet in response: "We're selling milkshakes all weekend. Have fun." Burger King's tweet was later banned by the UK's Advertising Standards Authority, because they felt that it "condoned the previous anti-social behaviour and encouraged further instances", and that it was therefore an "irresponsible" advertisement. At a separate visit in Newcastle on May 20, Farage had a Five Guys milkshake thrown at him. Carl Benjamin had a total of four milkshakes thrown at him that week. The act of milkshaking is similar to that of egging as a form of protest against political figures.

== In popular culture ==
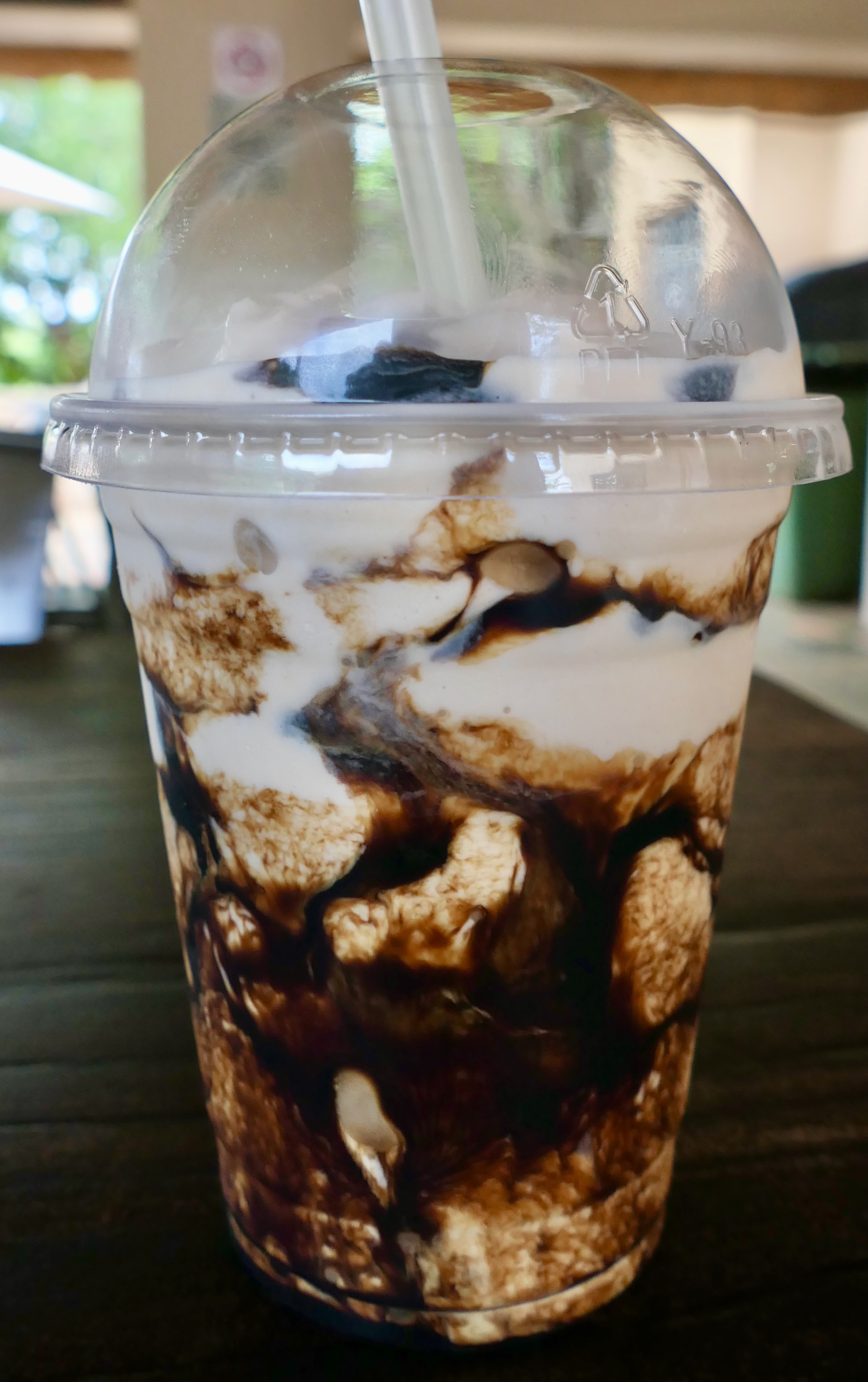
Chocolate Milkshake

Filmmakers sometimes utilize milkshakes as a visual shorthand for themes of purity, innocence, and uncorrupted youth, representing them as embodiments of 'sweetness and goodness. In All About Eve, by director Joseph L. Mankiewicz, Bette Davis's character is unhappy to see a man she likes chatting up her young female assistant, so Davis's character orders an alcoholic Martini, and "then mockingly suggests [that] Eve [the young assistant] will have a milkshake", thereby "asserting womanhood over girlhood through milkshake's associations with virginity". Similarly, the socially awkward character Steve Buscemi plays in Ghost World is made fun of by a teenage girl because he orders a "virginal vanilla milkshake"; in Manhattan, by director Woody Allen, the director draws attention to the difference in age between his 42-year-old character (he also acts in the lead role) and his teenage girlfriend by having her drink a milkshake. In the film Lolita in 1997, a teenage girl drinks a milkshake while she is with the middle-aged man (her mother's new boyfriend) who is attracted to her.

== See also ==
- Health shake
- Keventers Milkshake – an Indian milkshake brand
- Shake Shack – an American fast food restaurant chain emphasizing shakes
- Smoothie
- Frosty (frozen dairy dessert)
- McDonald's ice cream machine – the machine used to make ice cream and shakes at McDonald's
- Faloodeh – a liquid dessert or ice cream.
