= Right to repair =

Legal right and movement

Right to repair is a legal right for owners of devices and equipment to freely maintain, repair, or modify products such as automobiles, electronics, and farm equipment.

Common obstacles to repair include requirements to use only the manufacturer's maintenance services, restrictions on access to tools and components, and software barriers. These obstacles represent a repair monopoly, an aftermarket monopoly where a company controls the market for repairing and maintaining their products, making it difficult or even impossible for anyone to fix them. This can take the form of making it challenging or prohibitively expensive for individuals or independent third parties to get access to parts, manuals, or diagnostic tools. The purpose of repair monopolies is to force customers to either use the manufacturer's own repair services or purchase new equipment from the manufacturer.

Repair monopolies have been found to lead to higher prices, increased delays, reduced serviceability, and less choice for consumers. Proponents for the right to repair point to the benefits in affordability, sustainability, and availability of critical supplies in times of crisis. There is a social movement of citizens putting pressure on their governments to enact laws protecting a right to repair.

== Impacts ==
While initially driven mostly by automotive consumer protection agencies and the automotive after sales service industry, the discussion about establishing a right to repair, not only for vehicles but for any kind of electronic product, gained traction as consumer electronics such as smartphones and computers became universally available, causing broken and used electronics items to become the fastest growing waste stream. Today it is estimated that more than half of the population of the western world has one or more used or broken electronic devices at home that are not economically repairable.

In addition to the consumer goods, healthcare equipment repair access made news at the start of the COVID-19 pandemic in 2020, when hospitals had trouble getting maintenance for some critical high-demand medical equipment, most notably ventilators.

The pandemic has also been credited with helping to grow the right-to-repair movement since many repair shops were closed. The Economist also cites the expectation that owners of products should be able to repair them as a sense of moral justice or property rights. Those fighting against planned obsolescence have also taken note of when repair costs exceed replacement costs because the companies that created the product have retained a monopoly on its repair, driving up prices.

== Definition ==
Right to repair refers to the concept that end users of technical, electronic or automotive devices should be allowed to freely repair these products. Some notable aspects of a product include:

1. the device should be constructed and designed in a manner that allows repairs to be made easily;
2. end users and independent repair providers should be able to access original spare parts and necessary tools (software as well as physical tools) at fair market conditions;
3. repairs should, by design, be possible and not be hindered by software programming; and
4. the repairability of a device should be clearly communicated by the manufacturer.

Some goals of the right to repair are to favor repair instead of replacement, and make such repairs more affordable leading to a more sustainable economy and reduction in electronic waste.

=== Repair-friendly design ===
The use of glue or proprietary screws can make repairs more difficult. In general, proprietary parts and accessories can make products more difficult to repair, such as Apple's "Lightning" charging ports and adapters, which require a non-standard process to repair, leading the European Union to standardize charging ports for small devices, requiring all devices to use USB-C.

=== Accessible spare parts and tools ===
Parts and tools needed to make repairs, should be available to everyone, including consumers.

=== Software ===
Parts pairing or Serialization prevents parts being swapped without a password that the manufacturers provide to preferred technicians. This and other new ways to lock devices, including digital rights management, have become increasingly popular among manufacturers. Using approved parts can increase the cost of the repair, leading many consumers to speed up their upgrade cycle to a new device.

In addition to access to software updates, the ability to install third-party software is also mentioned as a major goal, which would, for example, allow some devices to be adapted over time.

=== Transparency ===
Manuals and design schematics should be freely available and help consumers know how to repair their devices.

Example of a law addressing different aspects of repairability
Aspect of repairability	Scope	Jurisdiction
Repairability scorecards		France
Standardized parts	USB-C	European Union
Parts pairing		Oregon
Third-party software allowed		
Software update support		
Sell spare parts		
Tools needed to make repairs can be found easily		
Manuals and design schematic freely available		

== History ==
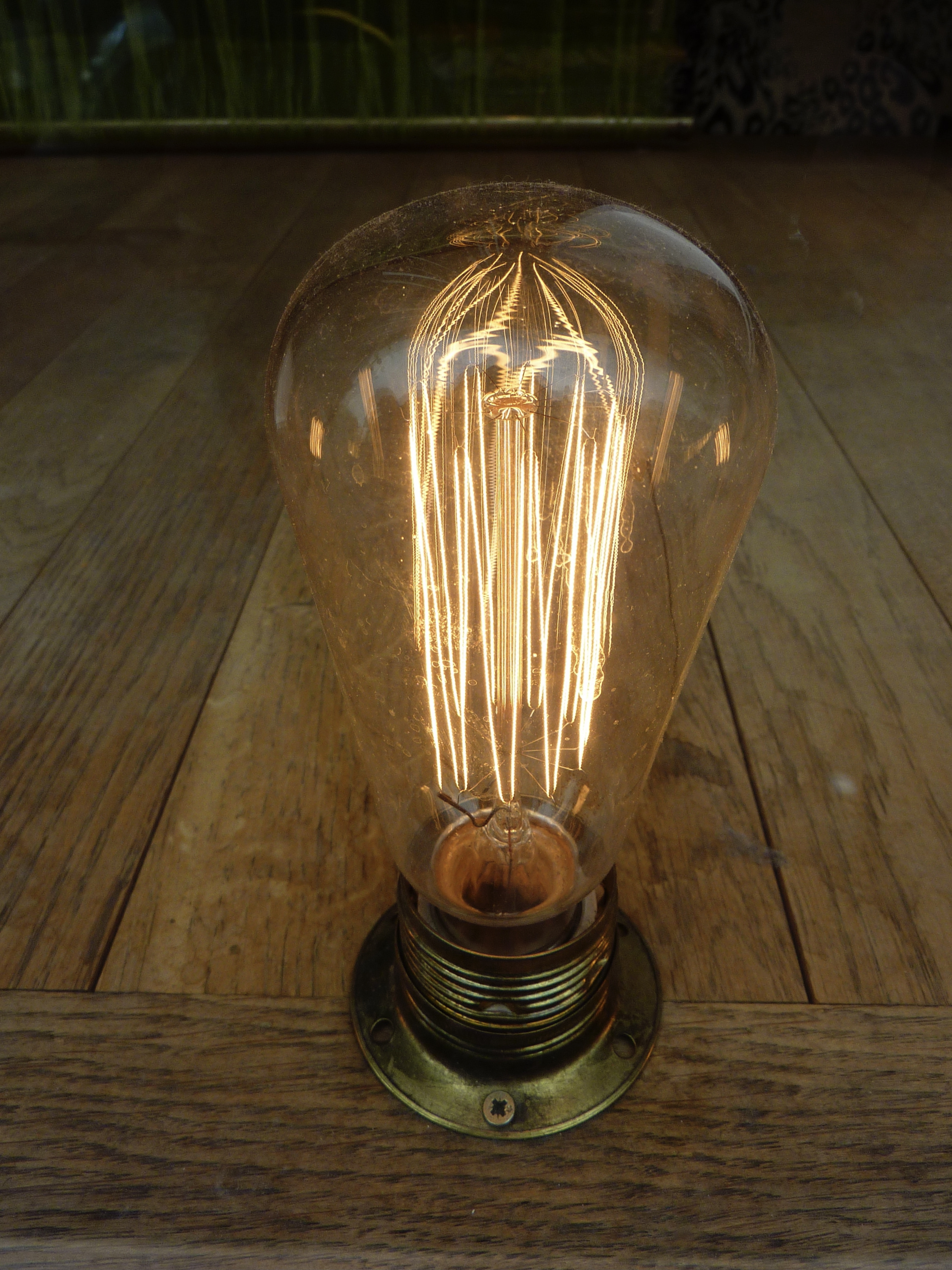
The Phoebus cartel is often claimed to be an example of planned obsolescence.

The strategy to continuously change products to create continuous demand for the latest generation was pursued at a large scale by General Motors executive Alfred P. Sloan. GM overtook Ford as the biggest American automaker and planned obsolescence with annual variants of a product became widely adopted across industries in the American economy, eventually becoming adopted by Ford by 1933.

The car industry was at the forefront of establishing the concept of certified repair: starting from the 1910s, Ford established certified dealerships and service networks to promote parts made by Ford instead of independent repair shops and often after-sales parts. Ford also pushed for standardized pricing among certified repair shops, making flat fees mandatory even for different repairs. The combination of annual updates to cars and components made it more difficult for independent repair shops to maintain a stock of parts.

A couple of court cases have required products with repaired or refurbished components to be labeled as "used."

In 1947, a business owner was refurbishing old spark plugs and reselling them. However, he was reselling them under a trademarked name. This led to a lawsuit that provided the framework for legislation that would provide a right to resell repaired or refurbished items, as long as they were labelled correctly.

Champion Spark Plug Co. v. Sanders provided the basis of FTC guidelines which provide an uninfringeable right to resell repaired or refurbished items as long as they were labeled as such. The decision also provided the framework for trademark guidelines regarding the resale of used goods under a trademarked namesake.

FTC guidelines Title 16, Chapter I, Subchapter B, Part 20 provides guidance and regulations on the labeling of items that have been "rebuilt", "refurbished", or "re-manufactured" in order to prevent unfair competitive advantage in selling components in the automobile industry. This guideline hence allowed businesses the ability to repair items, for resale later.

Some manufacturers shifted towards more repairable designs. Apple, which rose quickly to become one of the largest computer manufacturers, sold the first computers with circuit board descriptions, easy-to-swap components, and clear repair instructions, but has since developed a reputation for imposing strict repair restrictions on its products.

Copyright with regard to computer software source code also became a front on the limitation of repairability. In the U.S., the Digital Millennium Copyright Act of 1998 prohibits repairs unless granted an exception, and has been used to block repairs as software became more common in a range of devices and appliances.

To prevent refilling of empty ink cartridges, manufacturers had started placing microchips counting fill levels and usage, rendering refills difficult or impossible. Reselling and refurbishing products was confirmed to be legal by the Supreme Court in 2017 in Impression Prods., Inc. v. Lexmark Int'l, Inc.. As of 2022, complaints about the longevity and repairability of printers remains.

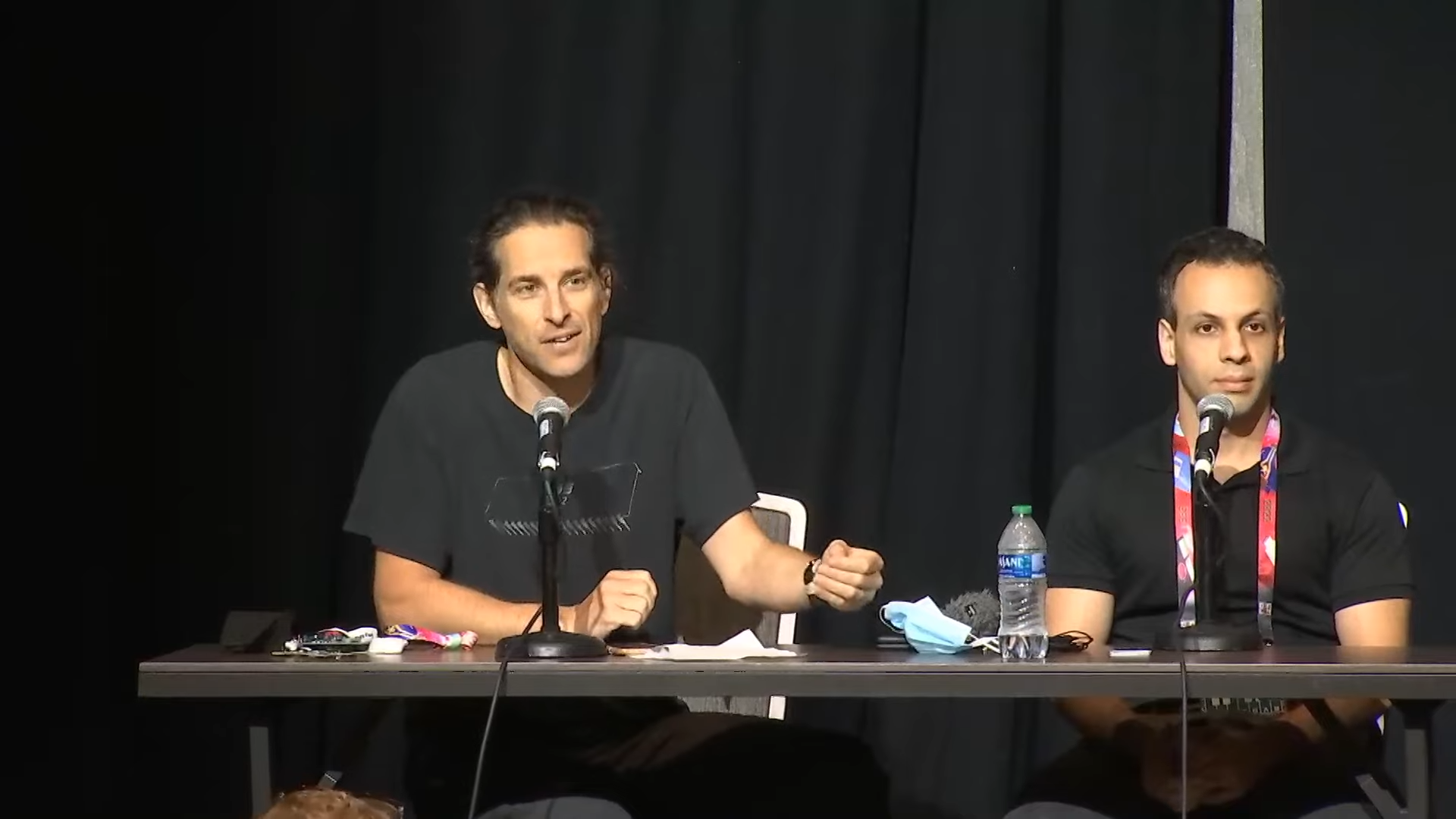
Right to repair activists Joe Grand and Louis Rossmann speaking at DEF CON 30

In the early 2000s, the automotive industry defeated the first proposal of a right to repair bill for the automotive sector. While the National Automotive Service Task Force (NASTF), an organization supported by the automotive industry, established an online directory for accessing manufacturer information and tools in 2001, a study conducted by the Terrance Group found that around 59% of independent repair services continued to struggle to get access to diagnostic tools and parts from manufacturers. The share of electronic components in the total bill of materials for a car also rose from 5% in the 1970s to over 22% in 2000. The increasing hybridization of cars brought the need of special tools that a manufacturer only shared with authorized repair services.

A trend towards right to repair in automotive and other industries gained traction with more proposed laws and court decisions. While initially driven by automotive consumers protection agencies and the automotive after-sales service industry, the discussion of establishing a right to repair for any kind of industrially produced device gained traction as consumer electronics such as smartphones and computers became widely used, alongside advanced computerized integration in farming equipment. The movement was also backed by climate change activists aiming to reduce e-waste.

Major events concerning the right to repair movement since 2000
Year	Events	Description	Notes
2012	Automotive right to repair passed in Massachusetts	Requires manufacturers to provide vehicle owners and independent repair shops with access to the same diagnostic and repair information as dealers and authorized repair shops.	The first automotive right-to-repair act in the U.S.
2014	Bill passes in the US to allow for phone unlocking	Enables consumers to unlock their cell phones in order to take them to a carrier that best suits their needs.	Forces mobile operators to unlock cell phones
2015	Library of Congress ruled in favor of repair-related exemption in DMCA	Broad protections for consumer devices that rely on copyrighted software to function.	DMCA act copy protection circumvention exemption for repairs
2021	France created repairability index	A rating from 1-10 providing a value for how repairable a device is.	First government to do so, modeled on iFixit's and HP-BATTERY scorecard.
2021	U.K. Right to Repair law in effect (Statutory Instruments 2021 No. 745)	Requires manufacturers provide repair information and spare parts available for repairs for up to ten years for certain new white goods and televisions.	Electronic appliance manufacturers required to be able to provide consumers with spare parts for "simple and safe" repairs and to make complex parts available to repair shops.
2022	Colorado enacts the Consumer Right to Repair Powered Wheelchairs	Concerning a requirement that a powered wheelchair manufacturer facilitate the repair of its powered wheelchairs by providing certain other persons with the resources needed to repair the manufacturer's powered wheelchairs.	First state in the U.S. to enact a right to repair law covering motorized wheelchairs
2022	New York enacts the Digital Fair Repair Act	Requires original equipment manufacturers to make diagnostic and repair information for digital electronic parts and equipment available to independent repair providers and consumers.	First state in the U.S. to enact a right to repair law covering consumer electronics
2023	Colorado enacts the Consumer Right to Repair Agricultural Equipment Act	Requires agricultural equipment manufacturers to provide owners or independent repair providers with the resources and information to repair their equipment.	First state in the U.S. to enact a right to repair law covering farming equipment
2023	Minnesota law passed	Requires manufactures of certain electronic products to make documentation, parts, and tools for diagnosis, maintenance, or repair available to independent repair providers and consumers.	It is the first right-to-repair law to address home appliances; the Verge called it 'groundbreaking'
2023	California enacts a Right to Repair Act	Requires that manufacturers of electronic and/or appliance products provide documentation, parts, and tools to owners, service and repair facilities, and service dealers for diagnostics and repair.	Engadget believes this bill will be the model for future federal legislation.
2024	European Union adopted a set of right-to-repair rules	Aims to make it easier and more cost-effective for consumers to repair their goods.	The rules are not yet finalized as they must be adopted by member states and approved by the Council. They seek to incentivize repair instead of replacement for consumer devices.
2024	Oregon bans parts pairing starting in 2025	Prohibits a practice known as "parts pairing," which can be used to block consumers from installing certain parts.	The first law to do so according to WIRED
2024	Colorado passes Consumer Right to Repair Digital Electronic Equipment	Expands the scope of the right-to-repair statutes to include digital electronic equipment manufactured and sold or used for the first time in Colorado on or after July 1, 2021.	"...most comprehensive right to repair bill in the country"
2025	Oregon parts pairing ban takes effect	Oregon's right-to-repair law took effect January 1, 2025, becoming the first U.S. state to prohibit "parts pairing" practices that prevent consumers from installing replacement parts without manufacturer approval.	Law applies to devices manufactured after January 1, 2025, with broader right-to-repair provisions covering devices sold since 2015.
2025	Texas passes a right-to-repair bill	Applies to all consumer electronics retailing over $50 sold after September 2026.	

The first successful implementation of a right to repair came when Massachusetts passed the United States' first right-to-repair law for the automotive sector in 2012, which required automobile manufacturers to sell the same service materials and diagnostics directly to consumers or to independent mechanics as they used to provide exclusively to their dealerships. As a result, major automobile trade organizations signed a Memorandum of Understanding in January 2014 using the Massachusetts law as the basis of their agreement for all 50 states starting in the 2018 automotive year.

Companies like Apple, John Deere, and AT&T have lobbied against right to repair bills, and created a number of "strange bedfellows" from high tech and agricultural sectors on both sides of the issue, according to Time. The tech industry has lobbied in opposition through groups like TechNet, the Entertainment Software Alliance ("ESA"). The Association of Equipment Manufacturers ("AEM") and their dealership counterparts the Equipment Dealers Association's 2018 Statement of Principles became the subject of media backlash when in January 2021 the promised means to make complete repairs had not been visibly available.

In late 2017, users of older iPhone models discovered evidence that recent updates to the phone's operating system, iOS, were throttling the phone's performance. This led to accusations that Apple sabotaged the performance of older iPhones to compel customers to buy new models more frequently. Apple disputed this assumed intention, stating instead that the goal of the software was to prevent overtaxing older lithium-ion batteries, which have degraded over time, to avoid unexpected shutdowns of the phone. Furthermore, Apple allowed users to disable the feature in an iOS update but advised against it. Additionally, Apple allowed users of affected iPhones to obtain service to replace batteries in their phones for a reduced cost of service (US$29 compared to US$79) for the next six months. However, the "right to repair" movement argued that the best outcome would be Apple allowing consumers to purchase third-party batteries and possess the instructions to replace it at a lower cost.

In April 2018, the Federal Trade Commission sent notice to six automobile, consumer electronics, and video game console manufacturers, later revealed through a Freedom of Information Act request to be Hyundai, Asus, HTC, Microsoft, Sony, and Nintendo, stating that their warranty practices may violate the Magnuson-Moss Warranty Act. The FTC specifically identified that informing consumers that warranties are voided if they break a warranty sticker or seal on the unit's packaging, use third-party replacement parts, or use third-party repair services is a deceptive practice, as these terms are only valid if the manufacturer provides free warranty service or replacement parts. Both Sony and Nintendo released updated warranty statements following this notice.

In April 2018, US Public Interest Research Group issued a statement defending Eric Lundgren over his sentencing for creating the 'restore disks' to extend the life of computers.

In 2018, the exemption for making software modifications to "land-based motor vehicles" was expanded to allow equipment owners to engage the services of third parties to assist with making changes. These changes were endorsed by the American Farm Bureau Federation. In its 2021 recommendations, the Library of Congress further extend the exemption, with favorable right-to-repair considerations for automobiles, boats, agricultural vehicles, and medical equipment, as well as modifying prior rules related to other consumer goods.

Senator Elizabeth Warren, as part of her campaign for president, laid out plans for legislation related to agriculture in March 2019, stated her intent to introduce legislation to affirm the right to repair farm equipment, potentially expanding this to other electronic devices.

In August 2019, Apple announced a program where independent repair shops may have the ability to buy official replacement parts for Apple products. Several operators became Authorized under their "IRP" program but many smaller repair operators avoided the option due to legally onerous burdens.

In the 2010s the trend of making one's own repairs to devices spread from the east into Western Europe. In July 2017, the European Parliament approved recommendations that member states should pass laws that give consumers the right to repair their electronics, as part of a larger update to its previous Ecodesign Directive from 2009 which called for manufacturers to produce more energy-efficient and cleaner consumer devices. The ability to repair devices is seen by these recommendations as a means to reduce waste to the environment. With these recommendations, work began on establishing the legal Directive for the EU to support the recommendations, and from which member states would then pass laws to meet the Directive. One of the first areas of focus was consumer appliances such as refrigerators and washing machines. Some were assembled using adhesives instead of mechanical fasteners which made it impossible for consumers or repair technicians from making non-destructive repairs. The right-to-repair facets of appliances were a point of contention and lobbying between European consumer groups and appliance manufacturers. Ultimately, the EU passed legislation in October 2019 that required manufacturers of appliances to be able to supply replacement parts to professional repairmen for ten years from manufacture. The legislation did not address other facets related to right-to-repair, and activists noted that this still limited the consumer's ability to perform their own repairs. Sweden also offers tax breaks for people who repair their own goods.

The EU also has directives toward a circular economy which are aimed toward reducing greenhouse gas emissions and other excessive wastes through recycling and other programs. A 2020 "Circular Economy Action Plan" draft included the electronics right to repair for EU citizens to allow device owners to replace only malfunctioning parts rather than replace the entire device, reducing electronics waste. The Action Plan included additional standardization that would aid toward rights to repair, such as common power ports on mobile devices.

In the midst of the COVID-19 pandemic, where medical equipment became critical for many hospitals, iFixit and a team of volunteers worked to publish and make accessible the largest known collection of manuals and service guides for medical equipment, using information crowdsourced from hospitals, medical institutions and sites like Frank's Hospital Workshop. iFixit had found, like with consumer electronics, some of the more expensive medical equipment had used means to make non-routine servicing difficult for end-users and requiring authorized repair processes.

2020 Massachusetts Question 1 passed to update the previous measure on automobile repair to include electronic vehicle data. Before it could come into effect, in June 2023, the federal National Highway Traffic Safety Administration instructed manufacturers to ignore the 2020 Massachusetts law, asserting it was preempted by federal law because opening telematics to other organizations could make cars more vulnerable to computer hackers. (Both claims are disputed by Massachusetts in the lawsuit.)

In May 2021, the Federal Trade Commission (FTC) issued a report "Nixing the Fix" to Congress that outlined issues around corporations' policies that limit repairs on consumer goods that it considered in violation of trade laws, and outlined steps that could be done to better enforce this. This included self-regulation by the industries involved, as well as expansion of existing laws such as the Magnuson-Moss Warranty Act or new laws to give the FTC better enforcement to protect consumers from overzealous repair restrictions.

In July 2021, the Biden administration issued an executive order to the FTC and the Department of Agriculture to widely improve access to repair for both consumers and farmers. The executive order to the FTC included instructions to craft rules to prevent manufacturers from preventing repairs performed by owners or independent repair shops. About two weeks later, the FTC voted unanimously to enforce the right to repair as policy and to look to take action against companies that limit the type of repair work that can be done at independent repair shops.

Apple announced in November 2021 that it would be allowing consumers to order parts and make repairs on Apple products, initially with iPhone 12 and 13 devices but eventually rolling out to include Mac computers. Reception to the program has been mixed, with Right to Repair advocate Louis Rossmann seeing the program as a step in the right direction, but criticized the omission of certain parts, and the need to input a serial number before ordering parts.

In 2021, France created a repairability scoring system that took inspiration from iFixit's scorecard. France expressed its intent to merge it into a 'Durability index' that also considers how long items are expected to last.

In 2022, Apple started enabling customers to repair batteries and screens. Additionally, Apple has prevented companies from repairing or refurbishing Apple's products without their permission. These action have irritated consumers who believe Apple is against the right to repair.

In 2022, Framework Computer, Adafruit, Raspberry Pi, among other computer systems, started sharing 3D-printable models for replacement parts.

On December 28, 2022, New York Governor Kathy Hochul signed into law the Digital Fair Repair Act, nearly seven months after it had passed the state senate. The law established the right of consumers and independent repairers to get manuals, diagrams, and original parts from manufacturers, although The Verge, Engadget, and Ars Technica noted that the bill was made less vigorous by way of last-minute changes that provided exceptions to original equipment manufacturers. It will apply to electronic devices sold in the state in 2023.

John Deere announced in January 2023 that it was signing a memorandum of understanding with the American Farm Bureau Federation agreeing that American farmers had the right to repair their own equipment or have it serviced at independent repair shops in the United States. Consumers and independent repair centers would still be bound against divulging certain trade secrets, and cannot tamper or override emission control settings, but are otherwise free to repair as they see fit.

In 2023, three business professors cautioned that right-to-repair laws by themselves, could have unintended consequences including incentivizing companies to create cheaper products that are lower-cost and less repairable or durable, or raise the initial sale price of the item.

In 2024 the FTC sent warning letters to eight companies -- notably four of them air purifier sellers -- about their warranty practices that inhibit consumers' right to repair products they have purchased. The letters illuminated concerns that the companies' practices violate the Magnuson-Moss Warranty Act.

The U.S. Copyright Office, as part of the tri-annual review of exemptions for the Digital Millennium Copyright Act, approved an exemption for bypassing technical controls for retail-level commercial food preparation equipment for the purposes of repair and maintenance. Notoriously, the inability for third-party repairs of such equipment had been the cause of numerous McDonald's ice cream machines being out-of-service, as the manufacturer, Taylor Company, had only allowed themselves to repair these machines.

== Enacted legislation ==
Some jurisdictions have enacted right-to-repair legislation.

=== Canada ===
On November 7, 2024, Bill C-244 received royal assent and became law, making Canada the first country to enact a national right-to-repair law.

=== European Union ===
Adopted on May 30, 2024, the European Union's Right to Repair Directive (R2RD) requires manufacturers to offer repair services that are both efficient and affordable, while also making sure consumers are aware of their repair rights. Specifically, according to the European Commission's summary of the Directive (2024/1799), manufacturers of products covered by EU reparability requirements and listed in the Directive's annex must offer repair "within a reasonable time" and "for a reasonable price," and are prohibited from using contractual clauses or hardware/software techniques that hinder repair of covered goods unless objectively justified.

The directive also introduces a voluntary European Repair Information Form that repairers can provide (usually free of charge on request), enabling consumers to compare repair conditions, price and timing; completed forms then remain valid for at least 30 days. In addition, Directive 2024/1799 amends the EU sales-of-goods rules so that when a consumer chooses repair (rather than replacement) within the seller's liability framework, the legal guarantee must be extended once by one year.

Moreover, to support market access to repair services, the directive provides for a European online platform for repair (with national sections or linked national platforms), including the possibility to list repairers and, optionally, sellers of refurbished goods and community-led initiatives, such as repair cafés. The common EU interface is to be developed by July 31, 2027, and the platform is expected to become fully operational by January 1, 2028. Member States must transpose the directive by July 31, 2026, with application from July 31, 2026.

Previously, the right to repair in the EU was regulated by the Sale of Goods Directive and the different product-specific Commission Regulations provided under the Ecodesign Directive.

=== United States ===
In the United States, the Federal Trade Commission (FTC) has examined repair restrictions in the context of consumer protection and competition policy. The 2021 report to Congress ("Nixing the Fix") describes common forms of repair restriction, such as limits on access to parts, tools, and proprietary diagnostic software, and analyzes their consumer and competitive effects.

The following is a list of legislation that has been enacted by the state's legislature and signed by the respective governor.

State legislation
State	Law	Bill	Effective date
California	PRC § 42488–42488.3	2023–24 SB 244	July 1, 2024
Colorado	C.R.S. § 6-1-1501 – 6-1-1505	HB23-1011	January 1, 2024
Colorado	C.R.S. § 6-1-1501 – 6-1-1505	HB24-1121	January 1, 2026
Massachusetts		Automotive Right to Repair	
Massachusetts		2020 Massachusetts Question 1	TBD
Minnesota	MN Stat. § 325E.72	2023 SF 2744	July 1, 2024
New York		Digital Fair Repair Act	July 1, 2023
Oregon	ORS 646A.850	2024 SB1596	July 1, 2027
Washington	RCW § 19.415, RCW § 19.425	2024 HB-1483	January 1, 2026

=== Australia ===
The right-to-repair has limited application. In 2021, the Productivity Commission released a report with many recommendation around the right to repair. In 2022, legislative changes introduced "The Motor Vehicle Repair and Service Information Sharing Scheme", which requires manufacturers, importers and others to provide information to repairers and Registered Training Organisations at a fair market price. It has since expanded to cover farm machinery. There are calls for more to be done.

== Right-to-repair NGOs ==
There is a growing list of non-governmental organizations which advocate for the right to repair, ranging from independent NGO advocacy groups to industry-sponsored organizations that advocate for their industry members.

=== Canada ===
- the Canadian Repair Coalition (CanRepair), a Canada-based group of repair professionals, individuals, academics, industry associations and firms who support Right to Repair policies at all levels of government.

=== EU ===
- the Right to Repair Europe Coalition, which represents over 170 organizations from 27 European countries. These include environmental NGOs and repair actors such as community repair groups, social economy actors, spare parts distributors, self-repairers, repair and refurbishing businesses.

=== USA ===
- the Repair Association, a US-based group of mostly smaller repair professionals and firms that support Right to Repair policies.
- the U.S. Public Interest Research Group's (PIRG's) right-to-repair campaign. US PIRG is a leading advocate for right-to-repair legislation at both the state and federal levels.
- iFixit is a leading source of online information regarding device repair and a leading advocate for right-to-repair laws.
- The Fulu Foundation was created by Louis Rossmann and Eron Jokipii in 2023 to expose companies' anti-ownership practices, educate the public, unite those in the repair industry, and lobby to reform anti repair legislation. The foundation also runs the Consumer Rights Wiki for people to document companies and products that violate the right to repair.

There are also innumerable Repair Cafés that are run in communities around the world. Some are sponsored by municipalities and others are mainly unaffiliated.

== See also ==
- Digital sovereignty
- Do it yourself, building, modifying, or repairing things by oneself without the direct aid of professionals
- Fix it First, a movement to prioritize spending to infrastructure repair over expansion
- Open-design movement
- Open source, decentralized software development model that encourages open collaboration
- Patch (computing)
  - Unofficial patch
- Reverse engineering, examining a product to learn how it works
- Take-back system, recycling
- Tool library, a place to borrow tools, instead of books
