= McFlurry =

Frozen dessert produced and sold by McDonald's

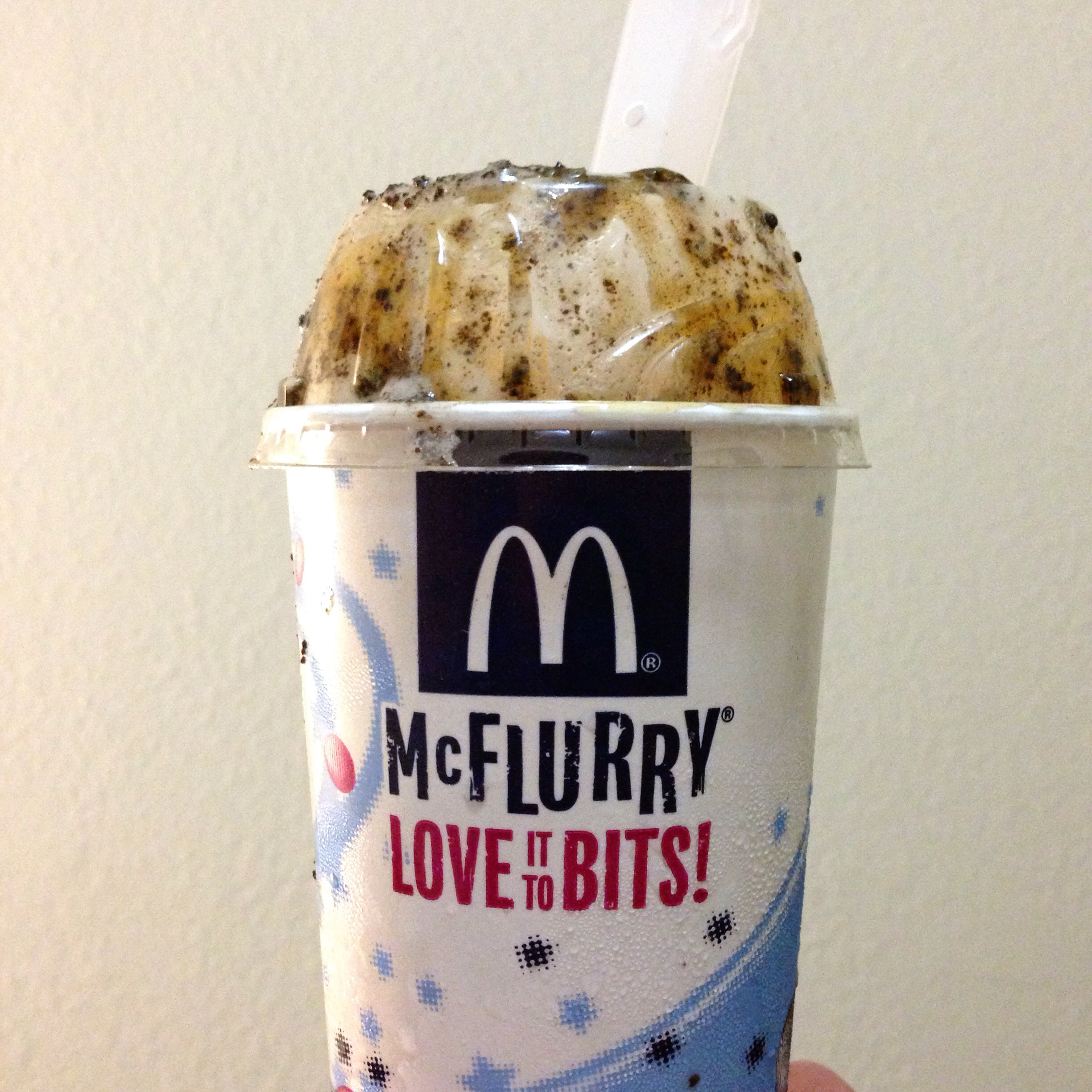
- Oreo-caramel flavored McFlurry
- Type: McDonald's frozen soft serve dessert
- Place of origin: Bathurst, New Brunswick, Canada
- Created by: Ron McLellan
- Invented: 1995

The McFlurry is a brand name of frozen soft serve dessert produced and sold by American-based multinational fast food chain McDonald's. It is served in a cup, with additional mixed-in ingredients such as candy and cookie fragments and sweet topping sauces. It was created in 1995 by Ron McLellan, a Canadian McDonald's franchise owner in Bathurst, New Brunswick, and later introduced to the United States in 1997.

== History ==
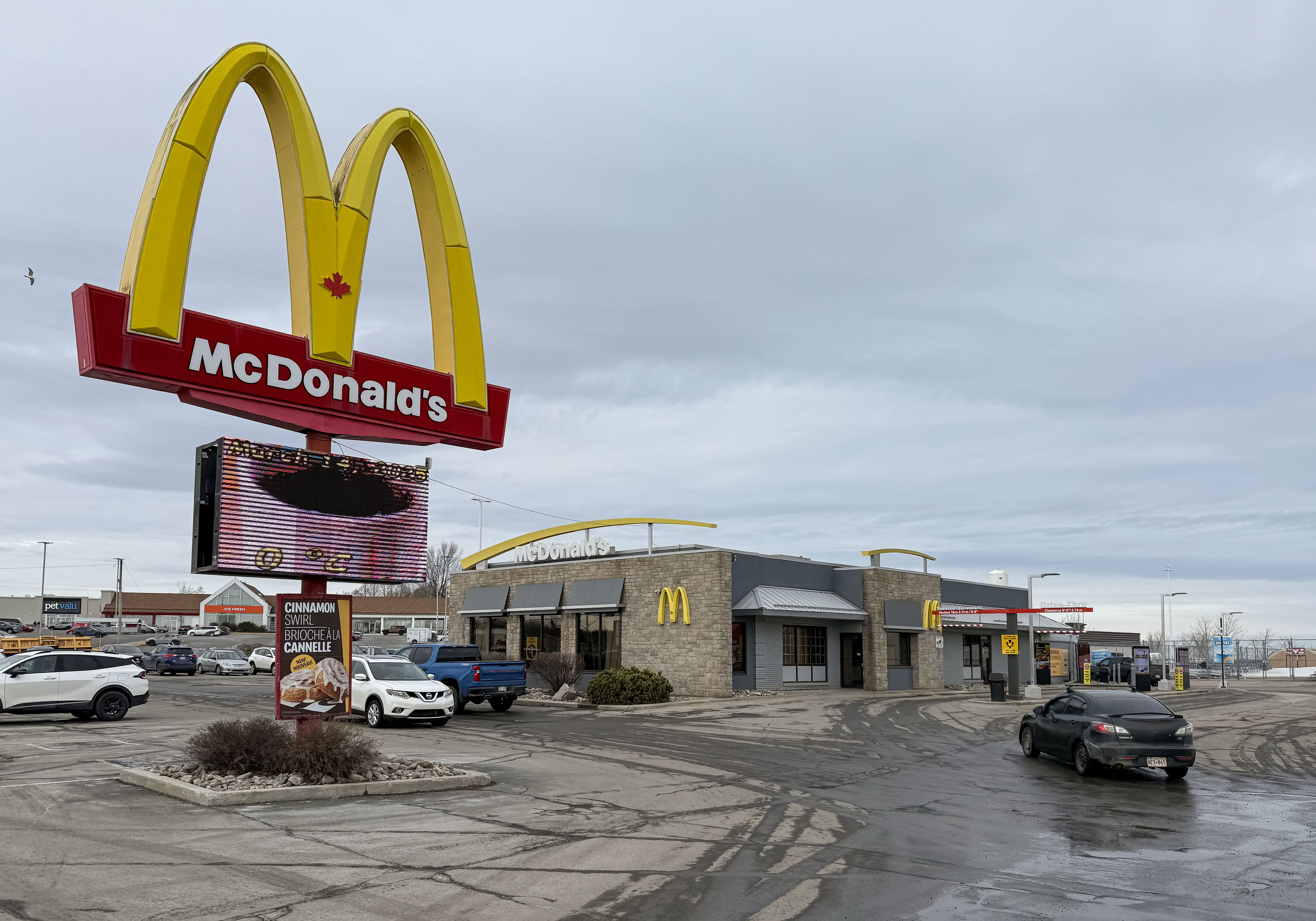
McDonald’s at 620 St Peter Ave in Bathurst, New Brunswick, where the McFlurry was created

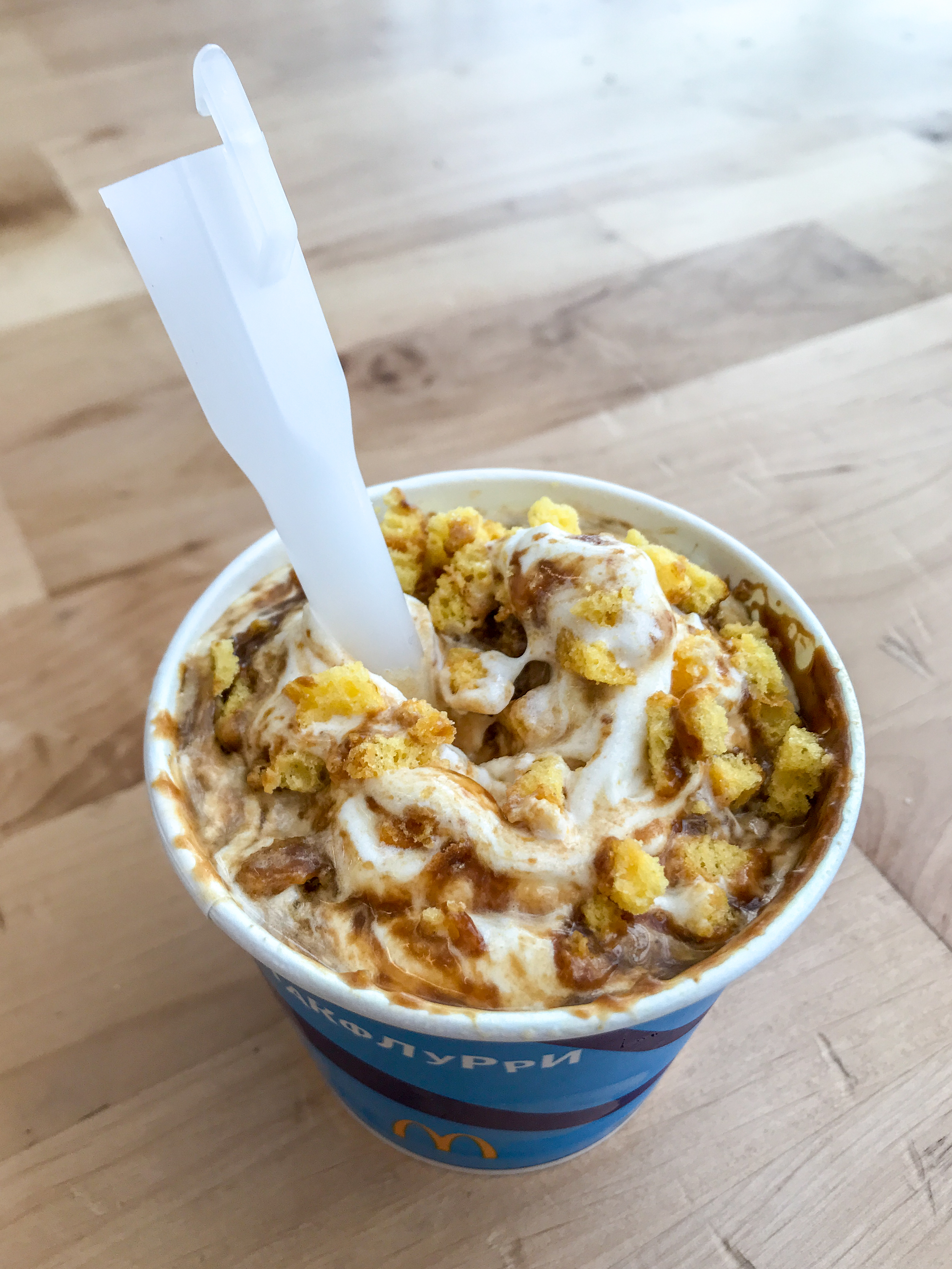
Tiramisu McFlurry without lid

The McFlurry was created by Canadian McDonald's franchisee Ron McLellan in Bathurst, New Brunswick, in 1995. The first McFlurry, which was Oreo-flavored, was sold on June 7, 1995. After proving successful in Bathurst, McDonald's began offering the McFlurry at a number of Toronto locations. In the U.S., the McFlurry was test-marketed in select regions in 1997. By March 1998, the product was available to all American and Canadian locations and has been gradually introduced in various other countries since then.

Until September 2006, the McFlurry was served with a container lid having an opening that was of a size that caused some animals to become trapped with their head stuck inside the discarded containers. An outcry in the UK, particularly to protect European hedgehogs, caused a redesign in the container shape. After "significant research and design testing", the company addressed the problem in 2006 by reducing the size of the opening to prevent entry of an animal's head. In June 2019, McDonald's announced it planned to stop using lids on McFlurrys in the United Kingdom by September 2019, as part of a move to reduce the use of single-use plastics by the chain. However, lids with circular openings are still being used in some other markets as of September 2023.

30 Rock prominently featured the McFlurry in the plot of its season 3 episode 11, "St. Valentine's Day". Although some commenters interpreted the prominence of the product in the episode as heavy-handed product placement, it was later reported that McDonald's had not paid to have it featured, and the show's producers were even worried that McDonald's might sue them for featuring it without authorization.

== Preparation ==
The McFlurry consists of whipped, soft serve McDonald's vanilla-flavored ice cream in a cup. The McFlurry has a specially designed spoon with a hole in the handle which is attached to a blender. Various types of candy or cookies are added to the cup, which are then blended into the ice cream using the spoon. In some markets where local regulations require reducing the use of single-use plastics (including Canada), the plastic spoon has been replaced with a disposable wooden one, and the McFlurry is blended using a reusable metal attachment prior to being served to the customer. McFlurry flavors vary from market to market, and new flavors are introduced regularly.

The ice cream in a McFlurry is the same that McDonald's uses for its cones and sundaes. The ice cream is made from ultra-high-temperature (UHT) pasteurized milk, extended with methylcellulose. CNBC reported that, from late 2016, McDonald's started phasing out artificial flavors from its vanilla ice cream. The change was part of an effort to recover the more than 500 million customer visits it had lost since 2012.

== Reviews ==
Despite referring to the McFlurry as "a quick-serve medley of gelatinous, innocuous ice cream that some reviewers might consider closer to caulk than dairy", Wil Fulton and Kat Thompson of Thrillist described the M&M McFlurry as "the epitome of low stakes, drive-thru fun", placing it at the end of their list of the 13 Best Fast Food Desserts. Dan Myers of The Daily Meal included the Oreo McFlurry in its (unranked) list of 10 Best Fast Food Desserts, saying "You'd be hard-pressed to encounter anyone who isn't a fan of this sweet treat."

== See also ==
- List of McDonald's products
- McDonald's ice cream machine

== Works cited ==
- Gillan, Jennifer (2010). Television and New Media: Must-Click TV. Routledge. ISBN 978-1-135-96567-9.
