= Louis Rossmann =

American YouTuber, technician and activist

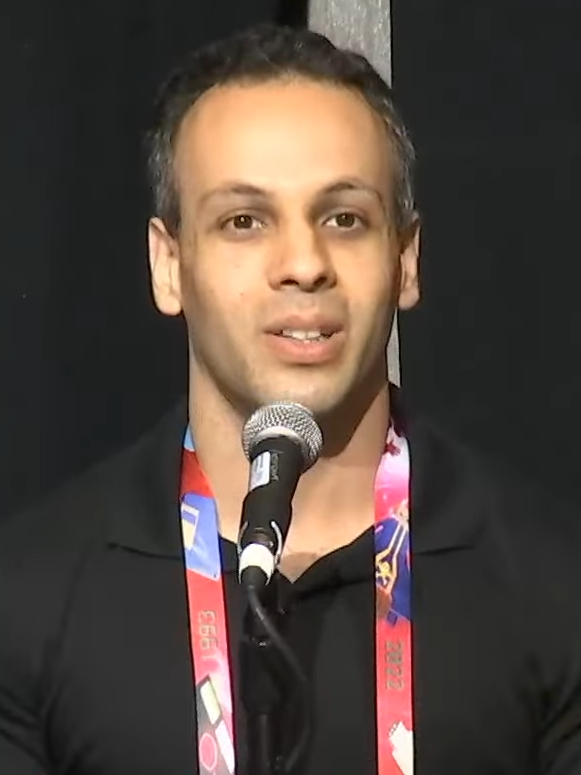
- Rossmann at DEF CON 30 in 2022
- Born: Louis Anthony Rossmann; November 19, 1988 (age 37); New York City, U.S.
- Occupations: Independent repair shop owner; YouTuber; right to repair activist

YouTube information
- Channel: Louis Rossmann
- Subscribers: 2.61 million
- Views: 645 million
- Last updated: July 9, 2026
- Website: www.rossmanngroup.com

Louis Anthony Rossmann (born November 19, 1988) is an American independent electronics technician, YouTuber, and consumer rights activist. He is the owner and operator of Rossmann Repair Group, a computer repair shop established in 2007 that specializes in logic board-level repair of MacBooks. He also started the Repair Preservation Group, a non-profit organization advocating for the right to repair.

Rossmann operates a YouTube channel that began with showcases and live-streams of his repairs as an educational resource. He has since shifted its focus to consumer rights and right to repair, along with videos on life, business practices and real estate. He also owns a channel on Odysee, which mirrors the content on his YouTube channel. Rossmann has actively campaigned for right to repair legislation to be passed in multiple city and state legislatures. In August 2022, Rossmann announced his move to Austin, Texas, to work for tech independence organization FUTO; his repair business followed in 2023. In 2025, Rossmann left FUTO and co-founded the FULU (Freedom from Unethical Limitations on Users) Foundation, a 501(c)(4) non-profit advocacy organisation focused on digital ownership rights.

== Campaigns ==
=== Criticism of Apple ===
On October 8, 2018, CBC News ran an investigative piece on Apple's business practices surrounding repair of their devices. They went undercover in an Apple Store with a malfunctioning MacBook Pro looking for a quote on repair. They explained that the screen was simply black, and they could not see anything on it. The Apple Store quoted a customer in their undercover video US$1,200 (equivalent to $1,539 in 2025) for a logic board replacement, explaining that the liquid contact indicators (LCIs) had been triggered, which would only happen if they had been in contact with any type of liquid. They concluded the whole logic board needed to be swapped out, in addition to the top case. When the machine was taken to Rossmann's repair shop, Rossmann explained that there was no liquid damage, and that simple room humidity likely set off the LCIs. He also explained that a pin that connected the MacBook Pro's backlight was simply not seated properly. After seating the pin properly, the MacBook Pro was seen working again. Rossmann explained his repair shop would likely not charge for simply re-seating the backlight pin. He has also spoken and testified in right to repair hearings in Boston, Maine, Washington state, and Nebraska. Rossmann has criticized the design of the third-generation MacBook Air. He notes that the fan is not positioned above the CPU, nor connected to it via any radiator circuit, calling it a "placebo fan", which can easily lead to overheating and damage.

In July 2021, Apple co-founder Steve Wozniak endorsed Rossmann's right-to-repair efforts and called for open sourcing in a Cameo video requested by Rossmann. Wozniak spoke about how electronic devices used to come with schematics, allowing anyone with the expertise to repair, if not improve, their devices, and credited this openness for the success of the Apple II. In January 2025, Rossmann founded the Consumer Action Taskforce Wiki, later renamed to the Consumer Rights Wiki, as a means to document consumer rights violations for the general public and consumers to read.

=== Right-to-repair campaigning ===
Rossmann has also appeared in right to repair campaigns related to farming machinery in Nebraska in March 2020. He was initially completely against any restrictions by companies on farmers from repairing their equipment (which might have resulted in voiding the equipment's warranty). Rossmann later admitted that his opinions were not completely correct due to a lack of expertise in farming machinery; this came after he received mail from a John Deere employee stating how allowing farmers to tune their tractors can result in harm to themselves and possible violation of environmental laws. (Note: Rossmann, Louis (March 19, 2020). John Deere employee responds to Right to Repair (Video) – via YouTube. Alt URL)

In March 2021, Rossmann started a crowdfunding campaign on the GoFundMe platform, with the goal of raising $6 million to start a direct ballot initiative protecting consumer right to repair in the state of Massachusetts, citing previous similar successes in the automotive industry. As of September 2025, the campaign has raised over $790,000.

In order to help right to repair efforts, he created the Repair Preservation Group, a 501(c)(3) non-profit organization. The organization's efforts are mainly concentrated in spreading the word about the right to repair and publishing documentation on an online wiki for repairing devices. Rossmann also directs the Repair Preservation Group Action Fund, which is another 501(c)(4) non-profit that actively lobbies for the passing of right to repair legislations.

=== FULU Foundation ===
In June 2025, Rossmann announced the formation of the FULU Foundation (Freedom from Unethical Limitations on Users) with Kevin O'Reilly, a 501(c)(4) non-profit organisation focused on digital ownership and the reform of laws that restrict owners' control over their devices, such as Section 1201 of the Digital Millennium Copyright Act. Unlike Rossmann's earlier campaigning, which emphasized the right to repair, his work with FULU is framed as advocating for broader digital ownership rights.

FULU operates a bounty program offering cash prizes for solutions that restore functionality to devices restricted by manufacturer digital rights management or other 'digital locks'. Successfully claimed bounties have included awards totaling approximately $14,000 each to two independent developers for restoring smart features to discontinued first- and second-generation Google Nest thermostats; a $20,000 award to app engineer Ricky Witherspoon for restoring offline functionality to Echelon exercise bikes after a firmware update removed it; and an award to Italian student Lorenzo Rizzotti for circumventing restrictions on Molekule air purifiers.

The FULU Foundation also funds the Consumer Rights Wiki, a community-edited wiki project started by Rossmann in January 2025 (originally called the Consumer Action Taskforce Wiki) to catalogue and document anti-consumer practices, with a particular focus on post-sale EULA modifications and server shutdowns that result in the remote disabling of consumer hardware. The wiki was originally hosted under a subdomain of Rossmann's business site and was later moved to its own domain (consumerrights.wiki) as a project of the FULU Foundation.

=== Clippy profile picture ===
On August 8, 2025, Rossmann uploaded a video encouraging internet users to change their profile pictures to an image of Clippy as a form of silent protest against unethical conduct by technology companies, such as mining personal data for the training of artificial intelligence programs or its sale to data brokers, planned obsolescence, censorship, or the use of ransomware. Clippy, in contrast, was seen by Rossmann as a harmless virtual assistant that only wanted to be helpful. (Note: Rossmann, Louis (August 7, 2025). Change your profile picture to clippy. I'm serious (Video) – via YouTube. Alt URL)

== Notable videos ==
On October 18, 2018, Rossmann uploaded a video entitled "Apple & Customs STOLE my batteries, that they won't even provide to AASPs." In the video, Rossmann explained that U.S. Customs seized his package containing 20 Apple MacBook batteries, worth US$1,068 (equivalent to $1,369 in 2025), labeling them as counterfeit goods. He claims the sole reason for the seizure was that the batteries he was importing bore Apple's trademark, and feels it is retribution for the CBC News piece, as Rossmann had been importing MacBook batteries for years without incident until shortly after the CBC story was published.

In 2018, Rossmann testified as a witness in a lawsuit from Apple towards an independent smartphone repair shop owner in Norway, Henrik Huseby, regarding the right to repair and authorized smartphone parts. The Norwegian court originally sided with Huseby but ruled in favor of Apple in 2019 after an appeal hearing showed Huseby had been using counterfeit parts. On June 5, 2019, Rossmann posted a video on YouTube where he appeared as a key witness in the case. In a June 29 video, he explained that the case ended with the court ruling in favor of Apple Inc. as the repair shop in question was using counterfeit parts, a detail Rossmann claims he was not aware of before testifying.
