= Autocrat, LLC =

Coffee manufacturing company

Autocrat

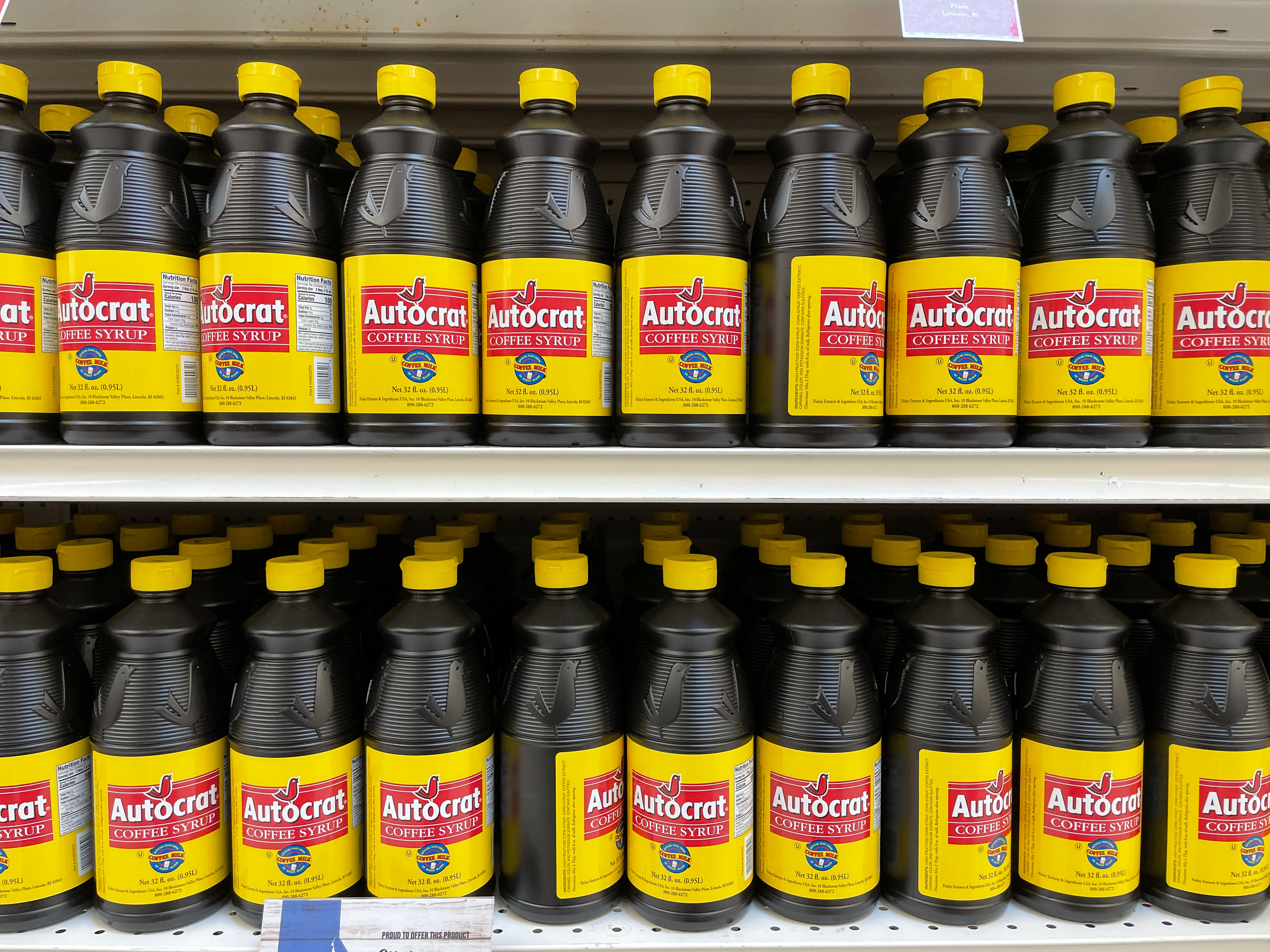
Autocrat bottles

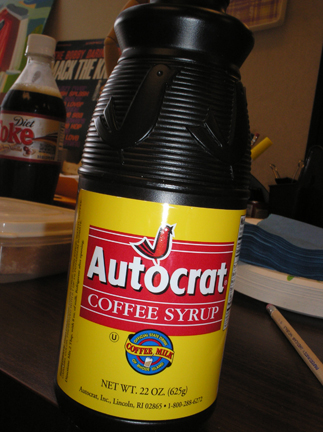
Autocrat coffee syrup

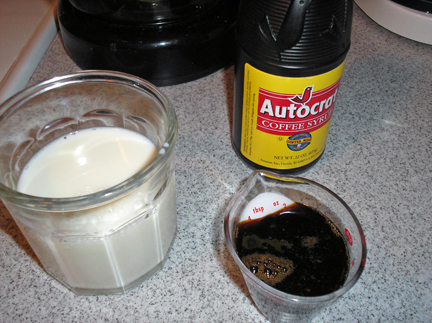
Autocrat coffee syrup being used to prepare coffee milk

Autocrat, LLC (now named Finlay Extracts and Ingredients USA (Finlays)) is a company manufacturing coffee and tea extracts based in Lincoln, Rhode Island, United States. The company's coffee syrups are often used to make coffee milk, which became the official state drink of Rhode Island in 1993. The company's name change occurred in 2015, and its retail products remain marketed under the Autocrat brand name.

== History ==
Autocrat, LLC was established in 1895 under the name Brownell & Field Coffee Company, and began manufacturing coffee syrup in the 1930s. In 1991, the firm acquired Eclipse, a coffee-syrup manufacturer, after which it became the sole manufacturer of coffee syrup in the United States. In January 2012, the firm partnered with RFI, LLC to expand coffee-product offerings. In April 2014, the company was acquired by James Finlay Limited, a British tea-extract producer, and continued to operate under the Autocrat name. In July 2015, the company's corporate name was changed to Finlay Extracts and Ingredients USA (Finlays). Retail products remain marketed under the Autocrat brand name.

== Products ==
The company produces a brand of coffee syrup under the Autocrat name, and as Coffee Time Syrup, and after the acquisition of Eclipse in 1991, it also continued to manufacture coffee syrup under the Eclipse brand name. It also manufactures and markets frozen and powdered coffee and tea extracts and concentrates.

Autocrat and Coffee Connection collaborated to invent the Frappuccino in 1992, and in 1994 Starbucks acquired all the 23 Coffee Connection locations, along with the trademark rights to the "Frappuccino" name.

In December 2013, Narragansett Brewing Company marketed a limited-edition stout brewed with Autocrat coffee syrup.
