= IFixit =

American company that offers parts and instruction for repair of consumer electronics

iFixit
- Type: Privately held company
- Founded: 2003; 23 years ago
- Headquarters: San Luis Obispo, California, U.S.
- Key people: Kyle Wiens (CEO); Luke Soules (CXO)
- Users: 1,200,000
- Content license: Creative Commons BY-NC-SA
- Website: ifixit.com

iFixit (/aɪˈfɪksɪt/ eye-FIX-it) is an American e-commerce and how-to website that publishes free wiki-like online repair guides and tear-downs of consumer electronics and gadgets. It also sells repair parts, tools, and accessories. It is a private company in San Luis Obispo, California, founded in 2003, spurred by Kyle Wiens not being able to locate an Apple iBook G3 repair manual while the company's founders were attending Cal Poly San Luis Obispo.

== Business model ==
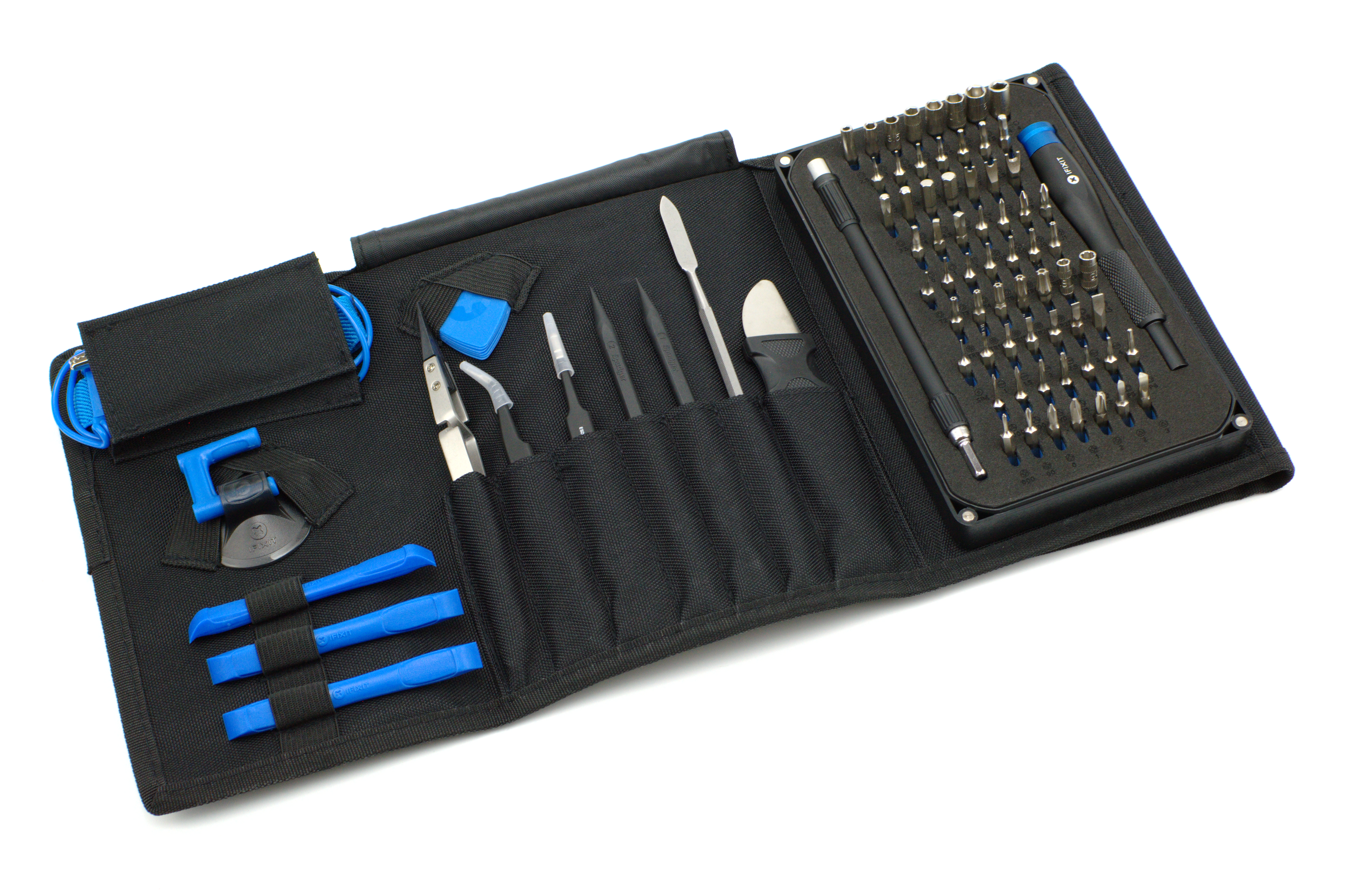
An iFixit Pro Tech Toolkit

iFixit has released product tear-downs of new mobile and laptop devices which provide advertising for the company's parts and equipment sales. These tear-downs have been reviewed by PC World, The Mac Observer, NetworkWorld, and other publications.

Co-founder Kyle Wiens has said that he aims to reduce electronic waste by teaching people to repair their own gear, and by offering tools, parts, and a forum to discuss repairs. In 2011, he travelled through Africa with a documentary team to meet a community of electronics technicians who repair and rebuild the world's discarded electronics.

iFixit provides a software as a service platform known as Dozuki to allow others to use iFixit's documentation framework to produce their own documentation. O'Reilly Media's Make and Craft magazines use Dozuki to feature community guides alongside instructions originally written by the staff for the print magazine.

On April 3, 2014, iFixit announced a partnership with Fairphone.

During the COVID-19 pandemic, iFixit and CALPIRG, the California arm of the Public Interest Research Group, worked with hospitals and medical research facilities to gather the largest known database of medical equipment manuals and repair guides to support the healthcare industry during the pandemic.

In 2022, iFixit announced plans to open a new distribution center and office in Chattanooga, Tennessee.

== Reception ==
In 2014, iFixit gave away 15,000 free liberation kits, created specifically for opening iPhones. Scott Dingle, a staff member at iFixit, wrote an article about the giveaway, explaining how they are fighting against Apple's corrupt practices and regaining their rights to repair. Scott Dingle made an interesting statement about iFixit's relationship with Apple;

"We're not necessarily actively anti-Apple or anti-‘the Man,' it's more like, we train other people to do it themselves."

In April 2019, it was revealed that some Oculus Quest and Oculus Rift S devices contain a physical Easter egg reading "Hi iFixit! We See You!", demonstrating that device manufacturers are aware of iFixit.

In September 2015, Apple removed the iFixit app from the App Store in reaction to the company's publication of a tear-down of a developer pre-release version of the Apple TV (4th generation) obtained under Apple's Developer Program violating a signed Non-Disclosure Agreement, and accordingly, their developer account was suspended. In response, iFixit says it has worked on improving its mobile site for users to access its services through a mobile browser.

In March 2022, Samsung announced that they would be collaborating with iFixit to provide a self-repair program and parts store for a range of their electronic devices. iFixit ended their collaboration with Samsung in May 2024, with co-founder Kyle Wiens saying "Samsung does not seem interested in enabling repair at scale."

In April 2022, Google announced that they would be partnering with iFixit to provide replacement parts for their Pixel series of smartphones.

In December 2024, Microsoft and its sub-company, Xbox, partnered with iFixit to provide guides and parts to its users. iFixit now sells and offers guides for Xbox Series X|S consoles and some Microsoft Surface devices.

== See also ==
- Consumer Rights Act 2015
- Do it yourself
- Magnuson–Moss Warranty Act
- Repair Café
- Right to repair
