= The Light Bulb Conspiracy =

- Directed by: Cosima Dannoritzer
- Written by: Cosima Dannoritzer
- Produced by: Patrice Barrat; Joan Úbeda
- Cinematography: Marc Martinez Sarrado
- Edited by: Georgia Wyss
- Music by: Marta Andrés; Joan Gil
- Production companies: Media 3.14; Article Z
- Distributed by: Banijay Rights
- Release date: 2010
- Running time: 75 minutes
- Countries: France; Spain
- Languages: English; French; German; Spanish; Catalan

The Light Bulb Conspiracy, also known as Pyramids of Waste, is a 2010 Franco-Spanish documentary film written and directed by Cosima Dannoritzer about the practice of planned obsolescence. In 2013, Dannoritzer and Jürgen Reuß co-published a book based on the film.

== Synopsis ==
The film documents the deliberate limitation by manufacturers of the lifespan of their products in order to secure sales of replacement and follow-up products. In addition to describing concrete examples, the film also explores the economic and ecological consequences of consumer society. French economist and philosopher Serge Latouche speaks about the concept of degrowth.

=== Documented examples ===
- The Centennial Light is considered to be the longest-lasting incandescent lamp in the world. It is used as evidence of collusion among incandescent lamp manufacturers in the Phoebus cartel, one of whose aims was to limit the average lifespan of lightbulbs to 1000 hours.
- The market strategy of Alfred P. Sloan, president of General Motors from 1923 to 1937, is used to illustrate the entry of planned obsolescence into the automotive industry.
- In the context of the Great Depression, Bernard London proposed in his work Ending the Depression Through Planned Obsolescence that all products be given an expiration date, after which they would have to be turned in to a government agency and destroyed. In this way, consumption was to be stimulated and jobs created.
- The Narva brand light bulb, which is also very durable, is treated as further evidence of the existence of planned obsolescence in modern light bulbs.
- Particularly resistant nylon pantyhoses are said to have been made more short-lived for the purpose of faster wear by using inferior material.
- The Epson Stylus C42UX inkjet printer is said to issue a defect message after a certain number of printed pages, whereupon further use of the printer is prevented. This lock, which is said to be caused by a chip specially present for this purpose, could be switched off with the help of special software.
- The battery of the iPod Classic is used as an example of planned obsolescence in modern consumer electronics.

== Reception ==
American historian Robert Friedel, in a 2013 review of the film, agreed with the film's assessment that Western consumer capitalism is unsustainable, but considered its execution flawed and its approach simplistic, specifically criticizing its exploration of the Phoebus cartel. He argues that the cartel was not secret, and that there are legitimate trade-offs between the longevity, brightness, and price of incandescent bulbs; moreover, Friedel attributes the longevity of the Centennial Light to its operation at a lower-than-normal voltage, which also makes the light much dimmer.

Paul Basileo, writing for Suffolk County Community College in 2012, opined that the documentary had great value in directing viewers to instances where cultural practices are influenced by business interests, and that it would provoke discussion and be useful for studies in many fields. However, Basileo argued that the film's presentation of environmental issues did not consider geopolitics, lacked the exploration of possible solutions, and that the segment connecting consumerism and the Cold War was "inserted in a rather uneven way".

== International versions ==
The film screened internationally at numerous film festivals as well as on television and was broadcast on German television several times on Arte and Phoenix starting in 2011. In the same year, it ran as a side event at the European Commission's Green Week.

Internationally, it was shown with the following titles:

- Catalan: Comprar, llençar, comprar
- Czech: Žárovková konspirace - Příběh plánovaného zastarávání
- Danish: Glødepære-konspiration
- English: The Light Bulb Conspiracy
- Finnish: Hehkulamppuhuijaus
- French: Prêt-à-jeter
- German: Kaufen für die Müllhalde
- Hungarian: A Villanykörte Összeesküvés – A tervezett elavulás története
- Italian: Il complotto della lampadina
- Norwegian: Garantert kort levetid
- Polish:Spisek żarówkowy
- Portuguese: A Conspiração da Lâmpada
- Russian: Заговор вокруг лампочки
- Spanish: Comprar, tirar, comprar
- Swedish: Glödlampskonspirationen
- Turkish: Ampul Komplosu

== Awards ==
- Best Documentary in Science, Technology and Education Award of the Guangzhou International Documentary Film Festival (GZDOC) 2010, China
- Best Documentary, Spanish Television Academy Awards, 2011
- Best Film, SCINEMA 2011, Australia
- Best Feature Documentary, Filmambiente 2011, Brazil
- Maeda Special Prize, NHK Japan Prize 2011
- Ondas Internacional 2011, Spanien (Mitgewinner: Joan Úbeda, Executive Producer)
- Special Jury Mention, FICMA 2011, Spanien
- Best Popular-Science Film - People and Environment 2012 (Russia)
- Best International Film - Kuala Lumpur Eco Film Festival (KLEFF) 2012 Malaysia
- Prix Tournesol for Best Environmental Documentary Film - Festival du Film Vert Suisse (Lausanne)
- Hoimar-von-Ditfurth-Preis of the Deutsche Umwelthilfe for best journalistic performance, Ökofilmtour 2013
  - Finalist, Focal International Awards 2011, London, U.K.
  - Finalist, Magnolia Awards, Shanghai International Film Festival 2011, China
  - Finalist, Prix Europa 2011, Berlin
