= Maurice Déribéré =

- Born: July 7, 1907
- Died: June 10, 1997
- Occupations: Chemical engineer, Author

Maurice Déribéré (July 7, 1907 – June 10, 1997) was a French chemical engineer, a specialist in color, and a prolific author on various subjects.

== Education and career ==
Maurice Déribéré, the son of a railway worker, pursued his studies at Lycée Lakanal and then at ESIEE Paris (currently ESIEE Paris). He graduated as an EBP engineer in 1928. In 1932, he became the production manager at Établissements Keller et Leleux, and in 1935, he became the editor-in-chief at Textiles et Techniques publications. The following year, he managed an electrochemistry company. In 1939, he was promoted to head of a research laboratory, and in 1954, he became the head of the illumination center for la Compagnie des Lampes Mazda, a position he held until 1972.

In parallel, he worked as a film still photographer for Sacha Guitry's film Napoleon in 1955. In 1969, he became the director of the magazine Couleurs and founded the Centre d'information sur la couleur the same year, which he presided over until his death.

He was a lecturer for various associations and several engineering schools.

== Research ==
His passion for color led him to explore various topics related to this theme. He conducted research on dermo-optical sensitivity, the physiological influence of light and color on humans, and the role of color in ancient and East Asian traditions. As a prolific author, he wrote books on technical processes related to color as well as on the use of colors in ancient and traditional worlds.

Maurice Déribéré invented fluography. He introduced several drying and thermal treatment processes using infrared radiation to Europe.

He was also passionate about minerals and traveling.

== Honors and awards ==
- Chevalier de la Légion d'honneur
- Chevalier de l'ordre des Palmes académiques

He received numerous other honors and awards.

== Selected bibliography ==
=== General works ===
- La couleur dans les activités humaines (Color in Human Activities), Dunod, 1958.
- La couleur (Color), Presses universitaires de France, Que sais-je ? collection, 2014 (12th edition, originally published in 1964) (table of contents).
- L'éclairage (Lighting), Presses universitaires de France, Que sais-je ? collection, No. 346, 1964.
- Préhistoire et histoire de la lumière (Prehistory and History of Light), Éditions France-Empire, 1979 (in collaboration with his wife Paulette).

=== Physics and technical works ===
- La coloration des papiers (Coloring of Papers), Éditions de la Papeterie, 1936.
- Le titane et ses composés dans l'industrie (Titanium and Its Compounds in Industry), Dunod, 1936.
- Les applications de la lumière de Wood et les rayons ultraviolets (Applications of Wood's Light and Ultraviolet Rays), Édition textile et technique, 1937.
- Les applications industrielles du pH (Industrial Applications of pH), Dunod, 1938.
- Les applications industrielles de la luminescence (Industrial Applications of Luminescence), 1938.
- La bentonite - les argiles colloïdales et leurs emplois (Bentonite - Colloidal Clays and Their Uses), Dunod, 1943.
- La photographie à l'infra-rouge (Infrared Photography), Éditions textiles et techniques, 1944.
- Les applications pratiques de la lumiscence (Practical Applications of Luminescence), Dunod, 1946.
- Les applications pratiques des rayons infrarouges (Practical Applications of Infrared Rays), Dunod, 1947.
- Les applications pratiques des rayons ultraviolets (Practical Applications of Ultraviolet Rays), Dunod, 1947.
- La photographie en couleurs (Color Photography), Publications Paul Montel, 1949.
- De l'ultraviolet à l'infrarouge (From Ultraviolet to Infrared), Éditions textiles et techniques, 1951.
- Trucs photographiques (Photographic Tricks), Prisma, 1958.
- L'éclairage et l'installation électrique dans le bâtiment (Lighting and Electrical Installation in Buildings) (collective work), Éditions Eyrolles, 1958 (2nd edition, 1968).
- L'éclairagisme : lumière et couleur (Lighting: Light and Color) (collective work), Les Yeux ouverts, 1962.
- La lumière dans notre vie - Techniques nouvelles d'éclairagisme (Light in Our Life - New Lighting Techniques), Revue Diagrammes, No. 113, July 1966.
- L'éclairage naturel et artificiel dans le bâtiment (Natural and Artificial Lighting in Buildings) (with Madame Chauvel), Éditions Eyrolles, 1967.

=== Works on nuclear energy ===
- L'énergie atomique (Atomic Energy), Éditions Elsevier, 1945.
- Expériences atomiques (Atomic Experiments), Éditions Elsevier, 1946.
- L'Uranium - la clef et la source des énergies nucléaires (Uranium - The Key and Source of Nuclear Energy), Elsevier, 1946.

=== Mineralogy and zoology works ===
- Bizarreries du monde minéral (Oddities of the Mineral World), Prisma, 1946.
- Le ver luisant - lumière vivante (The Firefly - Living Light), Prisma, 1946.
- Images étranges de la Nature (Strange Images of Nature), Éditions de Varenne, 1951.
- Le Caméléon, un caprice de la Nature (The Chameleon, a Whim of Nature), Éditions EREC.

=== Works on ancient and traditional worlds ===
- Connaissance de l'Afrique : L'Éthiopie, berceau de l'Humanité (Understanding Africa: Ethiopia, Cradle of Humanity), Société continentale d'édition moderne, 1972.
- Connaissance des Iles : Bali, l'île aimée des dieux (Understanding Islands: Bali, the Beloved Island of the Gods), Société continentale d'édition moderne, 1973.
- Au pays de la Reine de Saba - Les premiers matins du Monde (In the Land of the Queen of Sheba - The First Dawns of the World), Éditions France-Empire, 1977.
- Histoire mondiale du Déluge (World History of the Flood), Éditions Robert Laffont, 1978.
- Indonesia, Éditions Debroisse.
