= Phoebus cartel =

1925–1939 lightbulb cartel

- Predecessor: Internationale Glühlampen Preisvereinigung
- Formation: 15 January 1925; 101 years ago
- Founders: Osram, General Electric, Associated Electrical Industries, Tungsram and Philips among others
- Founded at: Geneva, Switzerland
- Dissolved: 1939; 87 years ago
- Type: Cartel
- Products: Incandescent light bulbs

The Phoebus cartel was an international cartel that controlled the manufacture and sale of incandescent light bulbs in much of Europe and North America between 1925 and 1939. The cartel took over market territories and lowered the useful life of such bulbs, which is commonly cited as an example of planned obsolescence.

Corporations based in Europe and the United States, including Tungsram, Osram, General Electric, Associated Electrical Industries, and Philips, incorporated the cartel on 15 January 1925 in Geneva, as Phœbus S.A. Compagnie Industrielle pour le Développement de l'Éclairage (French for "Phoebus plc Industrial Company for the Development of Lighting"). Although the group had intended the cartel to last for thirty years (1925 to 1955), it ceased operations in 1939 with the outbreak of World War II.

== History ==
Osram, Philips, Tungsram, Tokyo Electric, Associated Electrical Industries, ELIN, Compagnie des Lampes, International General Electric, and the GE Overseas Group created and joined the Phoebus cartel, holding shares in the Swiss corporation proportional to their lamp sales.

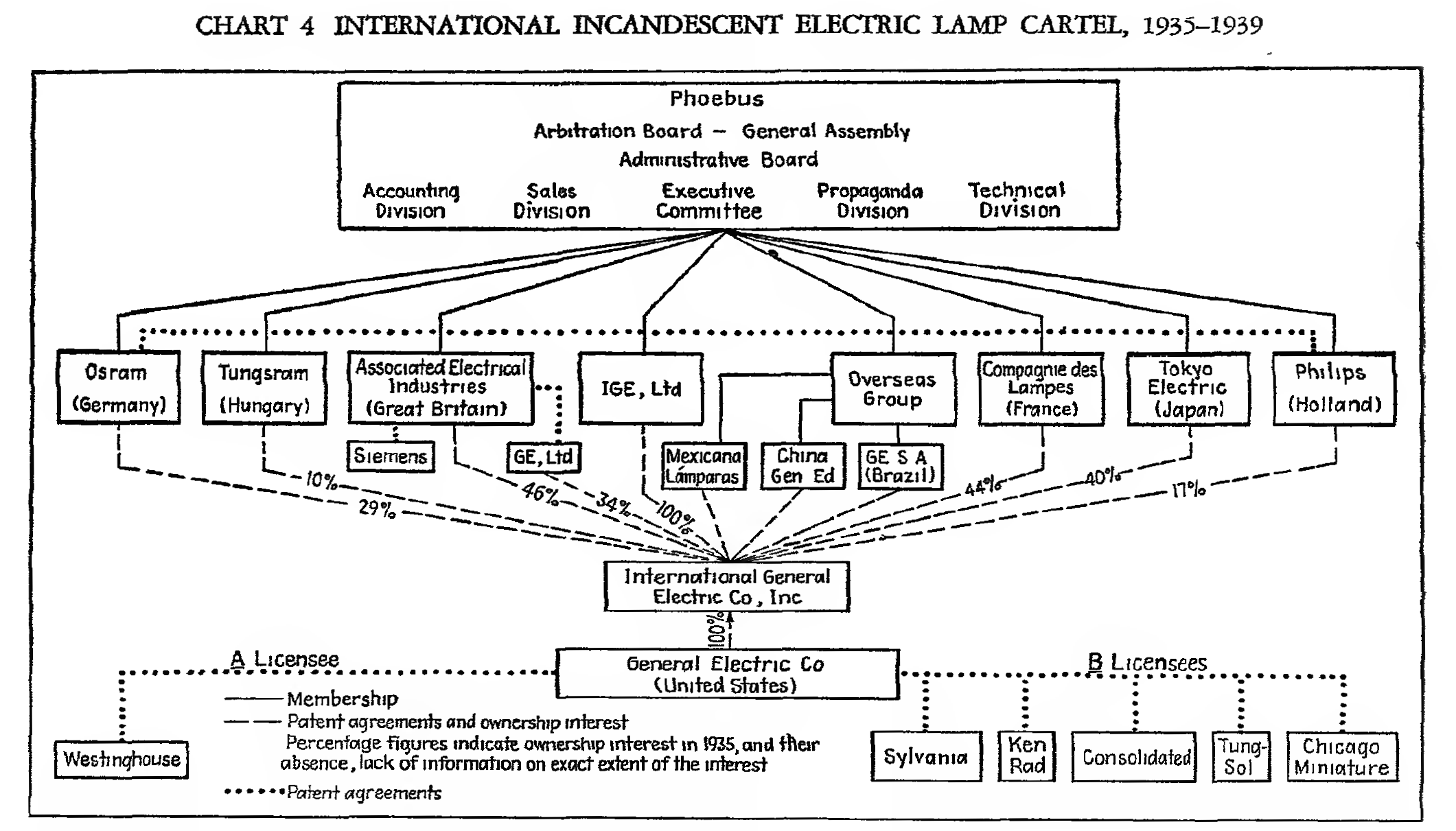
Structure of the cartel

Osram founded a precursor organisation in 1921, the Internationale Glühlampen Preisvereinigung. When Philips and other manufacturers entered the American market, General Electric reacted by setting up the "International General Electric Company" in Paris. Both organisations co-ordinated the trading of patents and market penetration. Increasing international competition led to negotiations among all the major companies to control and restrict their respective activities in order not to interfere in each other's spheres.

The Phoebus cartel's compact was intended to expire in 1955, but it was instead nullified in 1940 after World War II made coordination among the members impossible.

== Purpose ==
The cartel lowered operational costs and worked to standardize the life expectancy of light bulbs at 1,000 hours (down from 2,500 hours), while raising prices without fear of competition. The reduction in lifespan has been cited as an example of planned obsolescence. Regulators in the UK and some independent engineers have noted that there are benefits to shorter bulb lifespans, as shorter-life bulbs can be brighter for the same wattage. Nevertheless, both internal comments from cartel executives and later findings by a US court suggest that the cartel's direct motivation for the change was to increase profits by forcing customers to buy bulbs more frequently.

The cartel tested their bulbs and fined manufacturers for bulbs that lasted more than 1,000 hours. A 1929 table listed the amount of Swiss francs paid that depended on the exceeding hours of lifetime. Anton Philips, head of Philips, said to another cartel executive, "After the very strenuous efforts we made to emerge from a period of long life lamps, it is of the greatest importance that we do not sink back into the same mire by paying no attention to voltages and supplying lamps that will have a very prolonged life."

In 1949, the United States District Court for the District of New Jersey found General Electric to have violated the Sherman Anti-Trust Act, in part because of their activities as part of the Phoebus Cartel. As part of the decision, while acknowledging that "it should be borne in mind that the life of a lamp is inextricably related to the power of its light", it nonetheless found that because of General Electric's dominant industry position and lack of competition it had the power to determine bulb lifespan across the entire industry, and that General Electric's main consideration in setting the lifespans of bulbs was profit. The court used this as one of the factors for ultimately determining that General Electric had violated the Act.

In 1951, the Monopolies and Restrictive Practices Commission in the United Kingdom issued a report to Parliament, which disputed the idea that the Phoebus cartel engaged in planned obsolescence, stating that "there can be no absolutely right life [of light bulbs] for the many varying circumstances to be found among the consumers in any given country, so that any standard life must always represent a compromise between conflicting factors", and representatives of lightbulb manufacturers "had told us that in evidence that they regard the 1,000 hours as the best possible compromise at the present time, nor has any evidence been offered to us to the contrary" with the commission stating that they "must dismiss as misconceived" the allegation of planned obsolescence.

== In popular culture ==
In Gravity's Rainbow (1973), Thomas Pynchon wrote about "Byron the Bulb", an anthropomorphic eternal lightbulb who fights against the Phoebus cartel. Pynchon's novel has been credited with bringing the Phoebus cartel to the public eye.

== See also ==
- Centennial Light
- The Light Bulb Conspiracy
- Competition law
- The Man in the White Suit (1951)
