= Archaism =

Outdated language rarely used

In language, an archaism is a word, a sense of a word, or a style of speech or writing that belongs to a historical epoch beyond living memory, but that has survived in a few practical settings or affairs. Lexical archaisms are single archaic words or expressions used regularly in an affair (e.g. religion or law) or freely; literary archaism is the survival of archaic language in a traditional literary text such as a nursery rhyme or the deliberate use of a style characteristic of an earlier age—for example, in his 1960 novel The Sot-Weed Factor, John Barth writes in an 18th-century style. Archaic words or expressions may have distinctive emotional connotations—some can be humorous (forsooth), some highly formal (What say you?), and some solemn (With thee do I plight my troth).

A distinction between archaic and obsolete words and word senses is widely used by dictionaries. An archaic word or sense is one that still has some current use but whose use has dwindled to a few specialized contexts, outside which it connotes old-fashioned language. In contrast, an obsolete word or sense is one that is no longer used at all. A reader encounters them when reading texts that are centuries old. For example, the works of Shakespeare are old enough that some obsolete words or senses are encountered therein, for which glosses (annotations) are often provided in the margins.

Archaisms can either be used deliberately (to achieve a specific effect) or as part of a specific jargon (for example in law) or formula (for example in religious contexts). Many nursery rhymes contain archaisms. Some archaisms called fossil words remain in use within certain fixed expressions despite having faded away in all other contexts (for example, vim is not used in normal English outside the set phrase vim and vigor).

An outdated form of language is called archaic. In contrast, a language or dialect that contains many archaic traits (archaisms) relative to closely related languages or dialects spoken at the same time is called conservative.

== Etymology ==
The word archaism is from the Ancient Greek ἀρχαϊκός, archaïkós, 'old-fashioned, antiquated', ultimately ἀρχαῖος, archaîos, 'from the beginning, ancient'.

== Usage ==
Archaisms are most frequently encountered in history, poetry, fantasy literature, law, philosophy, science, technology, geography and ritual writing and speech. Archaisms are kept alive by these ritual and literary uses and by the study of older literature. Should they remain recognised, they can potentially be revived.

Because they are things of continual discovery and re-invention, science and technology have historically generated forms of speech and writing which have dated and fallen into disuse relatively quickly. However, the emotional associations of certain words have kept them alive, for example the archaic 'wireless' rather than 'radio' for a generation of British citizens who lived through the Second World War; but in recent years the term has been repurposed as a non-archaic term for wifi and cell-phone technology.

A similar desire to evoke a former age means that archaic place names are frequently used in circumstances where doing so conveys a political or emotional subtext, or when the official new name is not recognised by all (for example: 'Madras' rather than 'Chennai'). So, a restaurant seeking to conjure up historic associations might prefer to call itself Old Bombay or refer to Persian cuisine in preference to using the newer place name. A notable contemporary example is the airline Cathay Pacific, which uses the archaic Cathay for China.

Archaisms are frequently misunderstood, leading to changes in usage. One example is the phrase "odd man out", which originally came from the phrase "to find the odd man out", where the verb "to find out" has been split by its object "the odd man", meaning the item which does not fit. The object + split verb has been reinterpreted as a noun + adjective, such that "out" describes the man rather than any verb.

The pronominal adverbs found in the writing of lawyers (e.g. heretofore, hereunto, thereof) are examples of archaisms as a form of jargon. Some phraseologies, especially in religious contexts, retain archaic elements that are not used in ordinary speech in any other context: "With this ring I thee wed." Archaisms are also used in the dialogue of historical novels to evoke the flavour of the period. Some may count as inherently funny words and are used for humorous effect.

== Examples ==
A type of archaism is the use of thou, the second-person singular pronoun that fell out of general use in the 17th century, while you, formerly only used to address groups, and then also to respectfully address individuals, is now used to address both individuals and groups. Thou is the nominative form; the oblique/objective form is thee (functioning as both accusative and dative), and the possessive is thy or thine.

Though thou hast ever so many counsellors, yet do not forsake the counsel of thy own soul.

— English proverb

Today me, tomorrow thee.

— English proverb

To thine own self be true.

— William Shakespeare

Archaisms often linger in proverbs, "falling easier on the tongue", and employing two of the four fundamental rhetorical effects, permutation (immutatio) and addition (adiectio).

== See also ==
- Anachronism
- Fossil word
- Historical linguistics
- Legal English
- Linguistic conservatism
- List of alternative country names
- List of archaic technological nomenclature
- Neologism
- Thou
- Ye olde
