= Bernard London =

American real estate broker

Cover page from Ending the Depression Through Planned Obsolescence (1932)

Bernard London (born in 1872 or 1873) was an American real estate broker known for his 1932 paper Ending the Depression Through Planned Obsolescence. Scholars credit him with coining the term "planned obsolescence".

== Early life and career in real estate ==
London was born in 1872 or 1873 and began his career in Russia as a builder. London, who was Jewish, immigrated to the United States at the beginning of the 20th century. Giles Slade wrote that London was self-educated "in the history of building construction" and ultimately pursued a career in real estate in New York, New York. Slade also notes that London was a Freemason.

== Theories of planned obsolescence ==
Between 1932 and 1935, London wrote three essays in which he argued in favor of policies that facilitated planned obsolescence: Ending the Depression Through Planned Obsolescence (1932), The New Prosperity Through Planned Obsolescence: Permanent Employment, Wise Taxation and Equitable Distribution of Wealth (1934), and Rebuilding Prosperous Nations Through Planned Obsolescence (1935). All three essays were self-published and copies of his works are considered "extremely rare", though London registered these essays with the Library of Congress. Giles Slade notes that London began writing these essays "at a point of transition in his life — with plenty of time on his hands."

=== Ending the Depression Through Planned Obsolescence ===
Scholars trace the origins of the term "planned obsolescence" to London's 1932 paper, Ending the depression through planned obsolescence. However, Giles Slade notes that it is unclear whether London invented the phrase "planned obsolescence" himself or if the term "was already circulating in New York's business community." In this paper, London advocated "restructuring society around a body of experts whose mandate was to achieve an equilibrium of supply and demand that would eliminate technological unemployment." He stated that the problem of the depression was one of human relationships:

Primarily, this country and other countries are suffering from disturbed human relationships. Factories, warehouses, and fields are still intact and are ready to produce in unlimited quantities, but the urge to go ahead has been paralyzed by a decline in buying power. The existing troubles are man-made, and the remedies must be man-conceived and man-executed.

London felt that the solution to this problem would entail planning the obsolescence of the products so that new products should be acquired to replace them, therefore stimulating the economy. He argued that "the essence of my plan for accomplishing these much-to-be-desired-ends is to chart the obsolesce of capital and consumption goods at the time of their production". This would not be a "one time" solution, but a continuous policy that would also generate income for governments. However, during periods of employment the 'life' of goods could be extended:

Wouldn't it be profitable to spend a sum of—say—two billion dollars to buy up, immediately, obsolete and useless buildings, machinery, automobiles and other outworn junk, and in their place create from twenty to thirty billion dollars worth of work in the construction field and in the factory? Such a process would put the entire country on the road to recovery and eventually would restore normal employment and business prosperity.
