= List of archaic technological nomenclature =

Archaic technological nomenclature are forms of speech and writing which, while once commonly used to describe a particular process, method, device, or phenomenon, have fallen into disuse due to the advance of science and technology. Such archaism is inevitable where continual re-invention and discovery makes technical concepts, names and descriptions redundant.

== Context ==
As technology evolves, new names are required to describe the products, services, processes, methods, and devices invented. Often, the first names and phrases brought into use by are by the inventor(s), by journalists covering the development, and marketers trying to sell the services and products. Other terms were developed by the public to explain the technology that they used. Some of these terms were initially widely used, then fell out of the common vernacular. Others failed to "catch on" and never entered common usage in the first place. Sometimes, the technologies themselves were superseded, and the term fell into disuse.

In the history of science, forms of words are often coined to describe newly observed phenomena. Sometimes the words chosen reflect assumptions about the phenomenon which later turn out to be erroneous. In most cases, the original forms of words then become archaic and fall into disuse, with notable exceptions.

This list documents such archaisms.

== Computers and the Internet ==
Information superhighway or Infobahn
1990s terms for the internet.
Store
archaic term for memory (e.g. Primary store for RAM). Cf. 'storage', as used by IBM

== Domestic appliances ==
=== Radio ===
Left of the dial
Refers to the location on an analog radio band selector where most independent or college stations were (and are) located.
Transistorized
When transistor heralded a new age of mobile music, radio marketers advertised that the devices used this technology. Since the first "transistorized" radios were much smaller than vacuum tube radios people were used to, for a time "transistorized" conveyed a device's miniaturization. As late as the 1970s some even showed the precise number of transistors.
Wireless
Formerly used as a synonym for "radio" (or for a radio receiver), this once-obsolete term has now reentered the language to describe new uses of radio technology, in particular for computer-related functions like "wireless modems".

=== TV ===
Telectroscope: what eventually became called "television"

The White Dot
Television sets, in the past, powered down slowly as the capacitors in the power supply discharged and the picture collapsed down to a white dot in the centre of the screen that then faded away over a period of up to a minute. Many people of the 1940s-70s do remember this moment as the set was turned off at the end of viewing.
Televisor
A word used by pioneer John Logie Baird to describe what we now call a TV set
"Don't Touch That Dial"
An exhortation to remain tuned to the current television channel, it refers to the use of a rotary knob on television sets for selecting the channel from a limited selection of frequencies (typically a VHF dial for channels 2 to 13, optionally with a U option for tuning channels 14 to 83 in the UHF band on a second such dial). Archaic with the advent of button controls, particularly on remote controls, the phrase is even more obsolete with the change to digital television which sets have no traditional analog controls whatsoever.

== Transport ==
Clippy
Obsolete British expression for a female tram or bus conductor (ticket collector) who issued and validated the cardboard ticket by clipping the destination pre-printed on the cardboard ticket.
Horseless carriage
Deprecated term for an automobile or motor car. Still sometimes used to denote early automobiles. Some American states use "horseless carriage" on their registration plates for what other states classify as "antique" automobiles, those over 25 or 30 years old and not used on the public roads for transportation.

== Materials technology ==
"Bri-Nylon"
Portmanteau of the words British and Nylon made famous by textile fibre manufacturers such as Courtaulds.

== Electrical and electronics ==
Condenser/condensor
Early description for a capacitor.
Cycles per second (cps)
Frequency unit for alternating current, radio frequencies, etc.; replaced by the SI unit hertz (Hz).
Electron tube and thermionic valve
"Tubes" and "valves" are still being made, but these older terms are no longer used.
Hertzian waves
Archaic term for electromagnetic radiation
Micro-microfarad
Historic term for "picofarad".
Mho
Archaic term for unit of DC conductance. ohm^{−1} (siemens)

== Chemistry ==
Phlogiston
A theoretical fire-like substance posited as an addition to the four elements which could explain weight-gain through combustion. (Such weight gain actually represents addition of oxygen; an example is the prolonged heating of a metal in air, forming the metal oxide.)

== See also ==
- Archaism
- Gravity
- History of technology
- Obsolescence
- Steampunk

== Bibliography ==
- Karen J. Freeze, James C. Williams, Technology and Technical Sciences in History. ICOHTEC Symposium, Dresden, August 25-29, 1986. Technology and Culture, Vol. 28, No. 4 (Oct., 1987), pp. 842–849 doi 10.2307/3105187
