= The Waste Makers =

1960 book by Vance Packard

- First edition
- Author: Vance Packard
- Subject: Consumerism
- Publisher: David McKay
- Publication date: 1960
- Publication place: United States
- Pages: 306
- ISBN: 978-1935439370

The Waste Makers is a 1960 book on consumerism by Vance Packard. It was bestselling when it was released. The book argues that people in the United States consume a lot more than they should and are harmed by their consumption.

== Summary ==
One reviewer summarized the book's thesis as follows:

American society overemphasizes consumption, especially the quantity rather than the quality of what it consumes, and that it therefore sacrifices culture, prudence, and a proper concern for the future. He blames these distorted values on the business community, especially on the marketers and advertisers who have beguiled the public into accepting false standards.

Another reviewer noted:

[...] we overbuy -once we've been persuaded- as industry, facing the ""specter of glut"" for the products they have to sell, force feeds the public through a variety of pressures and mechanisms. These include ""growthmanship"" or needling purchasing appetites; throwaway strategy such as the ""disposable"" concept; and planned obsolescence, whether through styling or the calculated perishability of the product. The artificial aspects are far more extensive and there are sham elements in pricing, servicing, packaging, financing, commercializing to make the hard sell easy and promote prodigality. And the dollar sign on the price tag is not the only price to be paid-- our national resources are being destroyed along with our individual character and our family patterns.

Vance Packard worked to change the meaning of the term "consumerism" from a positive word about consumer practices to a negative word meaning excessive materialism and waste. The ads for his book The Waste Makers prominently featured the word "consumerism" in a negative way.

== Reviews ==
One reviewer said that the book is an examination of how economic growth became thought to be a virtue.

Another reviewer said that the book describes the manipulation of ordinary people by business interests. The reviewer for Commentary noted that Packard had made harsh attacks on businessmen.
