= Giles Slade =

Giles Slade is a Canadian freelance writer and social critic, best known as author of Made to Break: Technology and Obsolescence in America.

He was born in Ottawa, Ontario, Canada, and educated at Mutchmore Public School. Slade trained as a journalist, and also worked for a time for Harlequin Enterprises, writing adventure novels. He studied at the University of Southern California, defending his doctorate in cultural history. Slade lived and worked in the United States of America for many years. After earning his doctorate he taught at colleges and universities internationally, throughout Asia and the Persian Gulf, for another decade. He returned to Canada with his family and settled in British Columbia (2002).

His 2006 book, Made to Break: Technology and Obsolescence in America, documents the history of the planned obsolescence phenomenon in America. It won the International Publisher's Gold Medal (IPPY award) for best Environment/Ecology/Nature book of 2007, and the resulting media interest of some 200+ high-profile interviews helped to spread his ideas. The book was released in a paperback edition in October 2007.

The documentary film The LightBulb Conspiracy is based in part on Giles Slade's Made To Break: Technology and Obsolescence in America, and includes an interview with the author. It was made by Spanish filmmaker Cosima Dannoritzer and both broadcast on television in Europe, then shown at film festivals (including DOXA in Vancouver, 2012).

Slade wrote a column for Huffington Post from 2007 to 2011, and continues to publish critical perspectives and commentary in a variety of popular journals.

== Books ==
- Slade, Giles (2006), Made to Break: Technology and Obsolescence in America, Harvard University Press, ISBN 978-0-674-02203-4
- Slade, Giles (2012), The Big Disconnect: The Story of Technology and Loneliness, Prometheus Books, ISBN 978-1-61614-595-8
- Slade, Giles (2013), American Exodus: Climate Change and the Coming Flight for Survival, New Society Publishers, Limited, ISBN 978-0-86571-749-7
- Brokedown Palace (a.k.a. The North American Ark) available as chapter downloads, see Giles Slade on Scrib'd
