= Sony timer =

Japanese Urban Legend

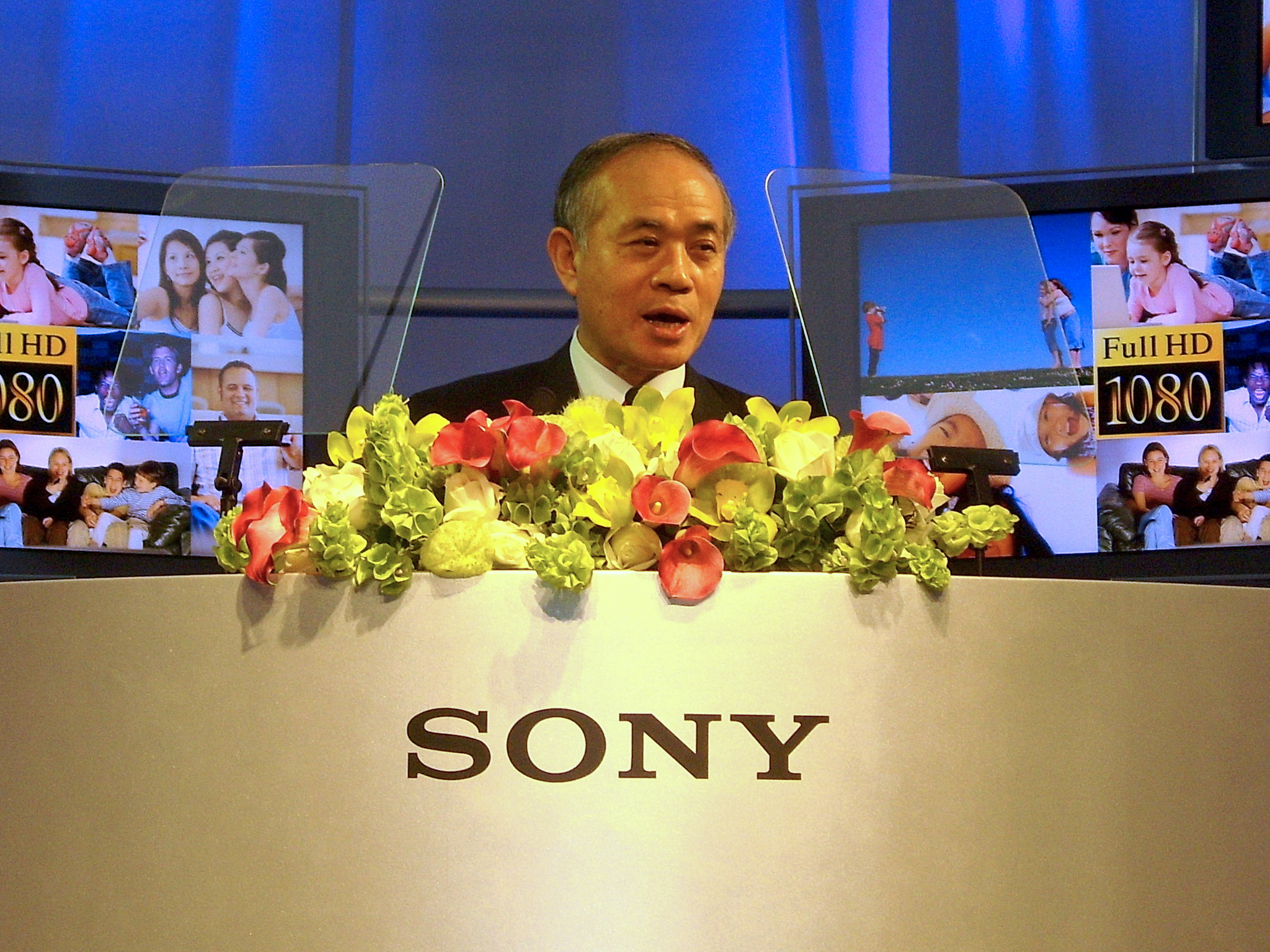
Sony's chairman of board of directors since 2005 to 2009, Ryōji Chūbachi said, in 2007, that the company was well aware of the existence of this urban legend

The Sony timer (ソニータイマー, Sonī taimā), or Sony kill switch, is an urban legend that electronic devices produced by Sony are equipped with a timer which, upon reaching a deliberately preset deadline, causes the product to stop functioning, forcing the user to buy a replacement. The legend began in Japan in the 1980s and was later repeated in other countries. The idea of products being designed to stop working after a period of time is today known as planned obsolescence.

== History ==
In Japan, the Sony timer spread around the late 1990s to early 2000s. Although there had never been any conclusive evidence which would confirm the legend, many Japanese people believed its existence, and it was regularly used as a joke in manga and posted on online message boards. The legend remained confined to Japan until 2006 when there was a recall of over 4 million Dell laptops equipped with battery packs containing defective Sony lithium ion cells, bringing back the legend of planned obsolescence among the Japanese people, who accused the Tokyo company.

The problem for Sony was the rumor's impact: as the company came out from the Japanese economic miracle and the kaizen ideology, it was in a very delicate situation which it tried to contain in every way, but the rumor inevitably came to the knowledge of consumers outside of Japan via the Internet. Although sales of the PlayStation 3 were not particularly affected by this urban legend, it did negatively affect sales of Sony Vaio laptop computers which, since 2007, were viewed with increasing suspicion by consumers. In addition to this, Google Trends signaled an increasing number of Internet searches indicating how Japanese purchasers found various problems with Vaio laptops.

A worsening of the situation occurred when, officially due to a software bug, it came to light that many Bravia televisions were predisposed with an operating time of about 1200 hours before they stopped functioning; Stranger still was that, used for a period of about 3 hours a day, such televisions would stop working exactly after warranty expired. The Tokyo company denied any direct responsibility and announced to release software patches as a solution, desperately trying to limit the rumors about the problem before they spread to Europe, where the company's presence was very strong, and admitting: "Our products are not designed to work badly".

However, the Sony timer legend had already spread widely across the World Wide Web, becoming part of the Internet culture itself.

The phenomenon resurfaced the mid 2010s when it was discovered that PlayStation 3 consoles were failing to update due to the console relying on its Wi-Fi and Bluetooth modules for updates. The only way to fix this issue is to replace the Wi-Fi / Bluetooth module with tools such as Microsoldering.

The legend resurfaced again in 2021 when it was discovered that an anti-cheat measure in PlayStation Network had the potential to render games unplayable on the PlayStation 3, PlayStation 4 and PlayStation 5 video game consoles due to their reliance on maintaining a mandatory accurate date and time setting, whether through connection to the network or a CMOS battery, in a phenomenon known as the C-bomb. Following outcry over the issue, Sony released a firmware update for the PS4 in late September 2021 that resolved the problem for this console, and did the same for the PS5 over a month later.
