= TM (triode) =

WW 1 radio tube

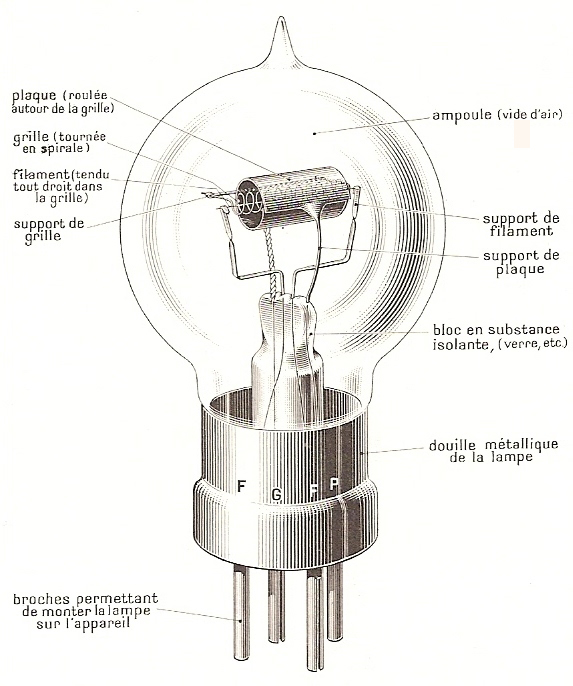
TM triode. Drawing from the 1915 Peri and Biguet patent

The TM (from French: Telegraphie Militaire, also marketed as TM Fotos and TM Metal) was a triode vacuum tube for amplification and demodulation of radio signals, manufactured in France from November 1915 to around 1935. The TM, developed for the French Army, became the standard small-signal radio tube of the Allies of World War I, and the first truly mass-produced vacuum tube. Wartime production in France is estimated at no less than 1.1 million units. Copies and derivatives of the TM were mass-produced in the United Kingdom as Type R, in the Netherlands as Type E, in the United States and in Soviet Russia as Р-5 and П-7.

== Development ==
Development of the TM was initiated by colonel Gustave-Auguste Ferrié, chief of French long-distance military communications (Télégraphie Militaire). Ferrié and his closest associate Henri Abraham were well informed about American research in radio and vacuum technology. They knew that Lee de Forest's audion and the British gas-filled lamp designed by H. J. Round were too unstable and unreliable for military service, and that Irving Langmuir's pliotron was too complex and expensive for mass production.

Shortly after the outbreak of World War I, a former Telefunken employee returning from the United States briefed Ferrié on the progress made in Germany and delivered samples of the latest American triodes, but again none of them met the demands of the Army. The problems were traced to insufficiently hard vacuum. Following suggestions made by Langmuire, Ferrié made a strategically correct decision to refine industrial vacuum pump technology that could guarantee sufficiently hard vacuum in mass production. The future French triode needed to be reliable, reproducible and inexpensive.

In October 1914 Ferrié dispatched Abraham and Michel Peri to Grammont incandescent lamp plant in Lyon. Abraham and Peri started with copying American designs. As was expected, the audion was unreliable and unstable, the pliotron and the first three original French prototypes were too complex. By trial and error, Abraham and Peri developed a simpler and inexpensive configuration. Their fourth prototype, which had vertically placed electrode assembly, was selected for mass production and was manufactured by Grammont from February to October of 1915. This triode, known as the Abraham tube, did not pass the test of field service: many tubes were damaged during transportation.

Ferrié instructed Peri to fix the problem, and two days later Peri and Jacques Biguet presented a modified design, with horizontally placed electrode assembly and the novel four-pin Type A socket (the original Abraham tube used an Edison screw with two additional flexible wires). In November 1915 the new triode was pressed into production and became known as the TM after the French service that developed it. Work by Ferrié and Abraham was nominated for the 1916 Nobel Prize in Physics. However, the patent was granted solely to Peri and Biguet, causing future legal disputes.

== Design and specifications ==
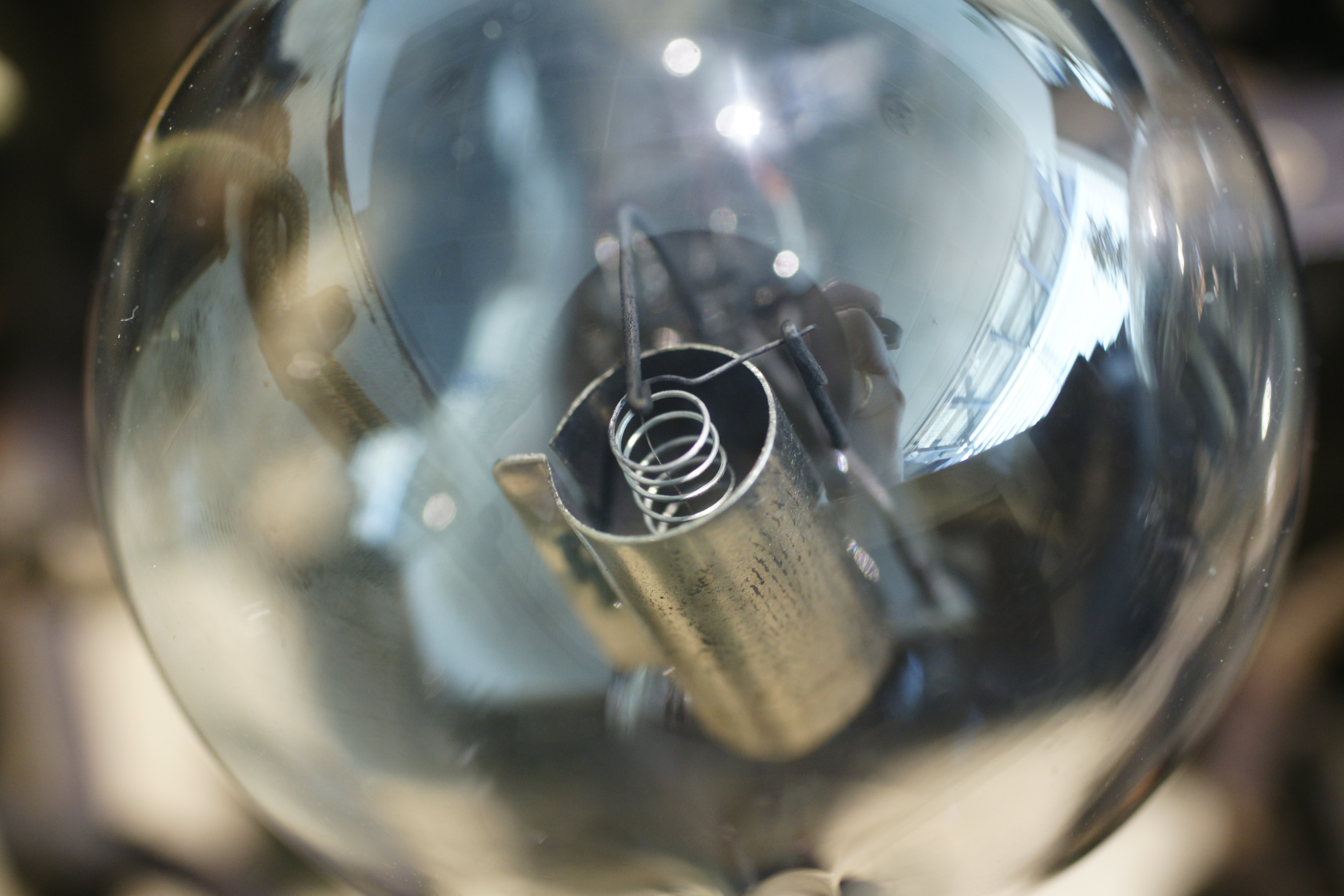
Anode (cylinder), grid (coil) and cathode filament (thin wire inside coil). British Type R tube

The electrode assembly of the TM has nearly perfect cylindrical shape. The anode is a nickel cylinder, 10 mm in diameter and 15 mm long. Grid diameter varies from 4.0 to 4.5 mm; the Lyon plant made grids of pure molybdenum, the plant in Ivry-sur-Seine used nickel. The directly-heated cathode filament is a straight wire of pure tungsten, 0.06 mm in diameter.

Pure tungsten cathode reached proper emission level when heated to white incandescence, which required heating current of over 0.7 A at 4 V. The filament was so bright that in 1923 Grammont replaced clear glass envelope with dark blue cobalt glass. There were rumours that the company tried to discourage alleged use of radio tubes in place of lightbulbs, or that they tried to protect the eyes of radio operators. Most likely, however, dark glass was used to mask harmless but unsightly metal particles that were inevitably sputtered on the inner surface of the bulb.

A typical single-tube radio receiver of World War I used 40 V plate power supply (B battery) and zero bias on the grid (no C battery required). In this mode, the tube operated at 2 mA standing anode current, and had transconductance of 0.4 mA/V, gain (μ) of 10 and anode impedance of 25 kOhm. At higher voltages (i.e. 160 V on the anode and -2 V on the grid), standing plate current rose to 3...6 mA, with reverse grid current up to 1 μA. High grid currents, an inevitable consequence of primitive technology of the 1910s, simplified grid leak biasing.

The TM and its immediate clones were general-purpose tubes. In addition to their original radio receiving function, they were successfully employed in radio transmitters. A single Soviet-made P-5 configured as a class C radio frequency generator withstood 500 to 800 Volts plate voltage, and could deliver up to 1 W into the antenna, while a class A circuit could only deliver 40 mW. Audio frequency amplification in class A was feasible using arrays of parallel-connected TMs.

Lifetime of a genuine French-made TM, built in strict compliance with the design, did not exceed 100 hours. During the war, factories inevitably had to use substandard raw materials which resulted in substandard tubes. These were usually marked with a cross and suffered from unusually high noise levels and random early failures due to cracks in their glass envelopes.

== Production history ==
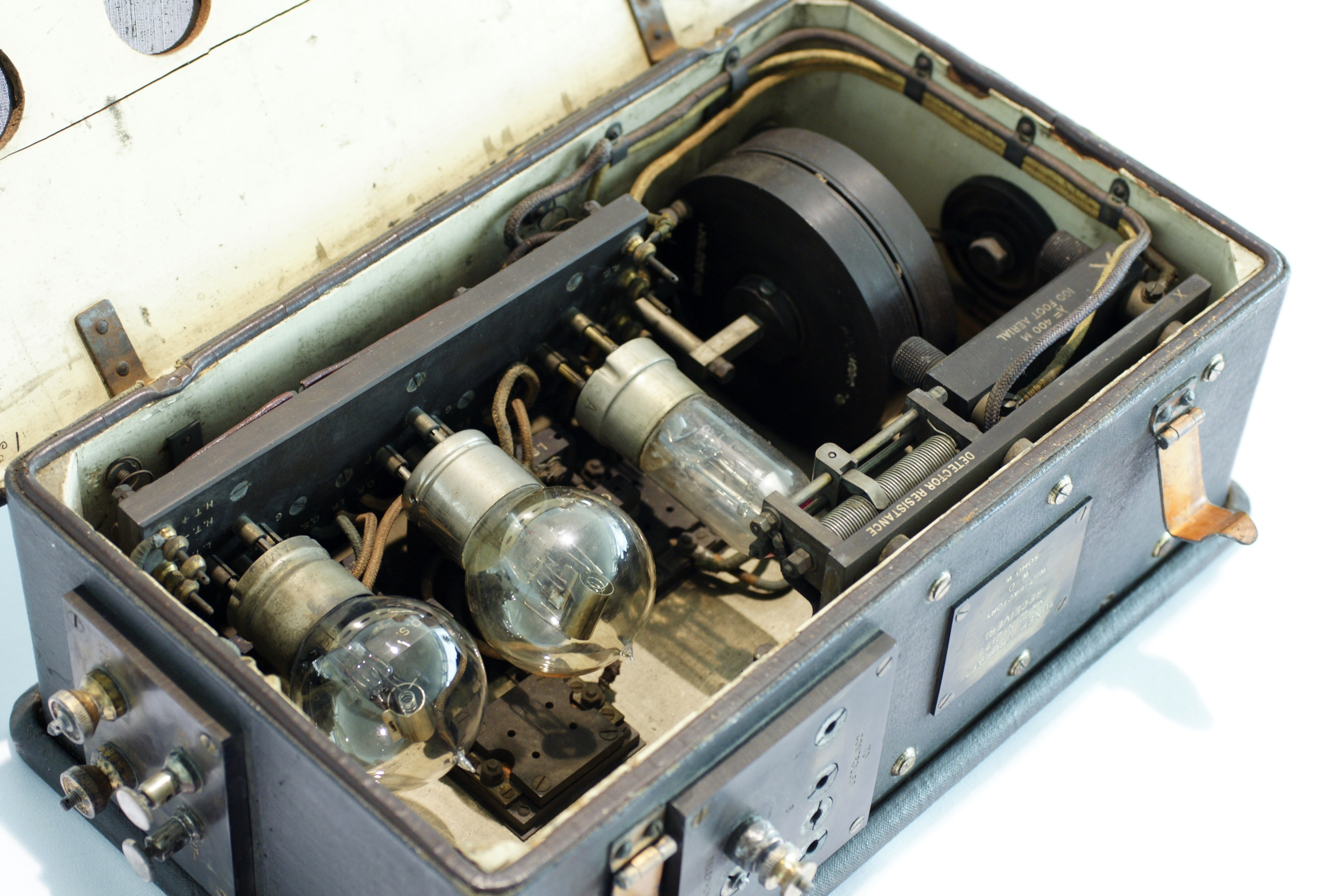
Two Type R triodes in a British Aircraft Tuner Receiver Mk. III, 1917

In the course of World War I the TM became the tube of choice of allied armies. Demand exceeded capacity of the Lyon plant, so additional production was delegated to La Compagnie des Lampes plant in Ivry-sur-Seine. Total production volume is unknown, but it was certainly very high for the period. Estimates of daily wartime production vary from one thousand units (Lyon plant alone) to six thousand units. Estimates of total wartime production vary from 1.1 million units (0.8 million in Lyon and 0.3 million in Ivry-sur-Seine) to 1.8 million units for the Lyon plant alone.

British authorities quickly realized the benefits of the TM over domestic designs. In 1916 British Thomson-Houston developed necessary technology and tooling, and Osram-Robertson (which would later merge into Marconi-Osram Valve) began large-scale production. The British variants became known collectively as type R. In 1916-1917 the Osram plant produced two visually identical triode types: "hard" (high vacuum) R1, almost exactly copying the French original, and "soft" nitrogen-filled R2. The R2 was the last in the line of British gas-filled tubes; all subsequent designs from R3 to R7 were high vacuum tubes. Variants of Type R triodes were made to British order in the United States by Moorhead Laboratories. After the war, Philips launched production of the TM in the Netherlands as Type E. Cylindrical construction patented by Peri and Biguet became a standard feature of British high-power tubes, all the way to the 800-Watt T7X.

When the United States entered the war, annual output of the three largest American manufacturers could barely reach 80 thousand tubes of all types. This was too low for a fighting army; soon after deployment in France American Expeditionary Forces outran the quota and had to adopt French radio equipment. Thus, the AEF relied primarily on French-made tubes.

In Russia, Mikhail Bonch-Bruevich launched small-scale production of the TM in 1917. In 1923 Soviet authorities purchased French technology and tooling, and launched large-scale production at the Leningrad Electro-Vacuum Plant which would later merge into Svetlana. Soviet clones of the TM were named P-5 and П7, a high-efficiency thoriated-cathode variant was named Микро (Micro).

After World War I the general-purpose TM was gradually supplanted with new, specialized receiving and amplifying tubes. In the developed countries of the West the change was largely completed by the end of the 1920s, at which point it had started in less developed countries like the Soviet Union. There is no certain information on the end of production; according to Robert Champeix, production in France probably continued until 1935. In the late 20th century, replicas of the TM were released at least twice, by Rudiger Waltz in Germany (1980s) and by Ricardo Kron in Czech Republic (1992).

== Sources ==
- Berghen, F.v.d. (2002). "About the French TM Valve, the Forerunner of the R-Valve". British Vintage Wireless Society Magazine (2): 20–23. (Based on Champeix paper)
- Champeix, R. (1980). "Grande et Petite Histoire de la Lampe TM". Bulletin de Liaison (in French) (Nov–Dec): 1–48.
- Ginoux, J.-M. (2017). History of Nonlinear Oscillations Theory in France (1880-1940). Springer. ISBN 9783319552392. (Based on Champeix paper)
- Vyse, B. (1999). "Marconi Osram Valve. Extracts from 'The Saga of Marconi Osram Valves'". British Vintage Wireless Society Magazine (4): 12–20.
