= Edison and Swan Electric Light Company =

Light bulb manufacturer

Edison and Swan Electric Light Company Limited
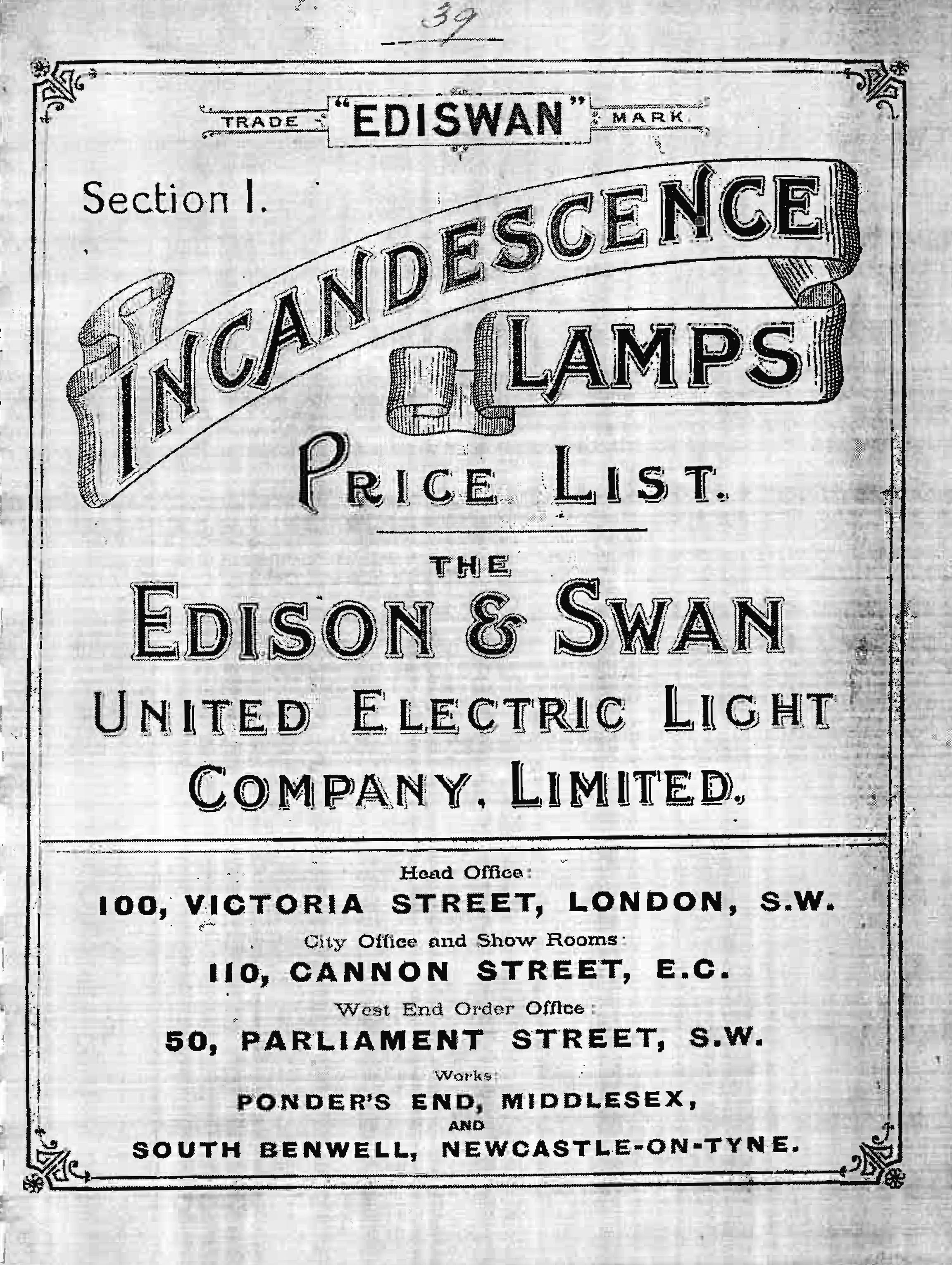
- Edison & Swan United Electric Light Company Limited, catalogue and price list 1893, front cover
- Type: Limited company
- Industry: Electric industry
- Predecessor: Edison & Swan United Electric Light Company
- Founded: 1883
- Founder: Thomas Edison; Joseph Swan
- Defunct: 1964
- Fate: Merged to British Lighting Industries Ltd.
- Successor: Siemens Ediswan
- Headquarters: 100 Victoria Street, London; 155 Charing Cross Road, London
- Key people: James Staats Forbes (chairman)
- Products: Lamps, radio valves, cathode ray tubes
- Parent: Associated Electrical Industries (1928–1964)

The Edison and Swan Electric Light Company Limited was a manufacturer of incandescent lamp bulbs and other electrical goods. It was formed in 1883 with the name Edison & Swan United Electric Light Company with the merger of the Swan United Electric Company and the Edison Electric Light Company.

Thomas Edison established the Edison Electric Light Company in 1878. Joseph Swan established the Swan United Electric Light Company in 1881. Swan sued Edison in the UK, claiming patent infringement; this was upheld by the British courts. In 1882, Edison sued Swan, claiming infringement of his 1879 U.S. patent; however, the Edison Company believed their case would be jeopardized if Swan could demonstrate prior research and publication. Subsequently, in order to avoid uncertain and expensive litigation, the two companies negotiated a merger. The glass bulbs sold in Britain were of Swan's design, while the filaments were of Edison's. From 1887 or earlier Sir Ambrose Fleming was an adviser to the company, and conducted research at Ponders End.

The company had offices at 155 Charing Cross Road, London, and factories in Brimsdown, Ponders End and Sunderland. In 1928, the company was acquired by Associated Electrical Industries. In 1956, a new cathode ray tube plant was opened in Sunderland. The company was renamed Siemens Ediswan following the takeover of Siemens Brothers by AEI in 1957. In 1964, AEI merged its lamp and radio valve manufacturing interests with those of Thorn Electrical Industries to form British Lighting Industries Ltd.

== Ediswan valves ==
Edison Swan (or later Siemens Edison Swan) produced a wide range of vacuum tubes and cathode ray tubes under the names "Ediswan" or "Mazda" and the 1964 Mazda Valve Data Book claimed: "Professor Sir. Ambrose Fleming... was Technical Consultant to the Edison Swan Company at the time. It was this close co-operation between University and Factory which resulted in the first radio valve in the world." Ediswan still survives as a manufacturer of valves (located in Bromsgrove England).

== See also ==
- La Compagnie des Lampes (1921), EdiSwans French counterpart, which also made light bulbs and electronic tubes under the Mazda brand
