= La Compagnie des Lampes =

French electrical and lighting companies

- Native name: Compagnie des Lampes
- Type: Joint venture (1921)
- Industry: Lighting, vacuum tubes, electrical products
- Founded: 1921 (joint venture); Original plant: 1888
- Founders: CFTH; CGE
- Headquarters: Ivry-sur-Seine, France
- Key people: Paul Blavier (founder of 1911 predecessor)
- Products: Light bulbs, vacuum tubes
- Brands: MAZDA, Métal, Lampe Mazda

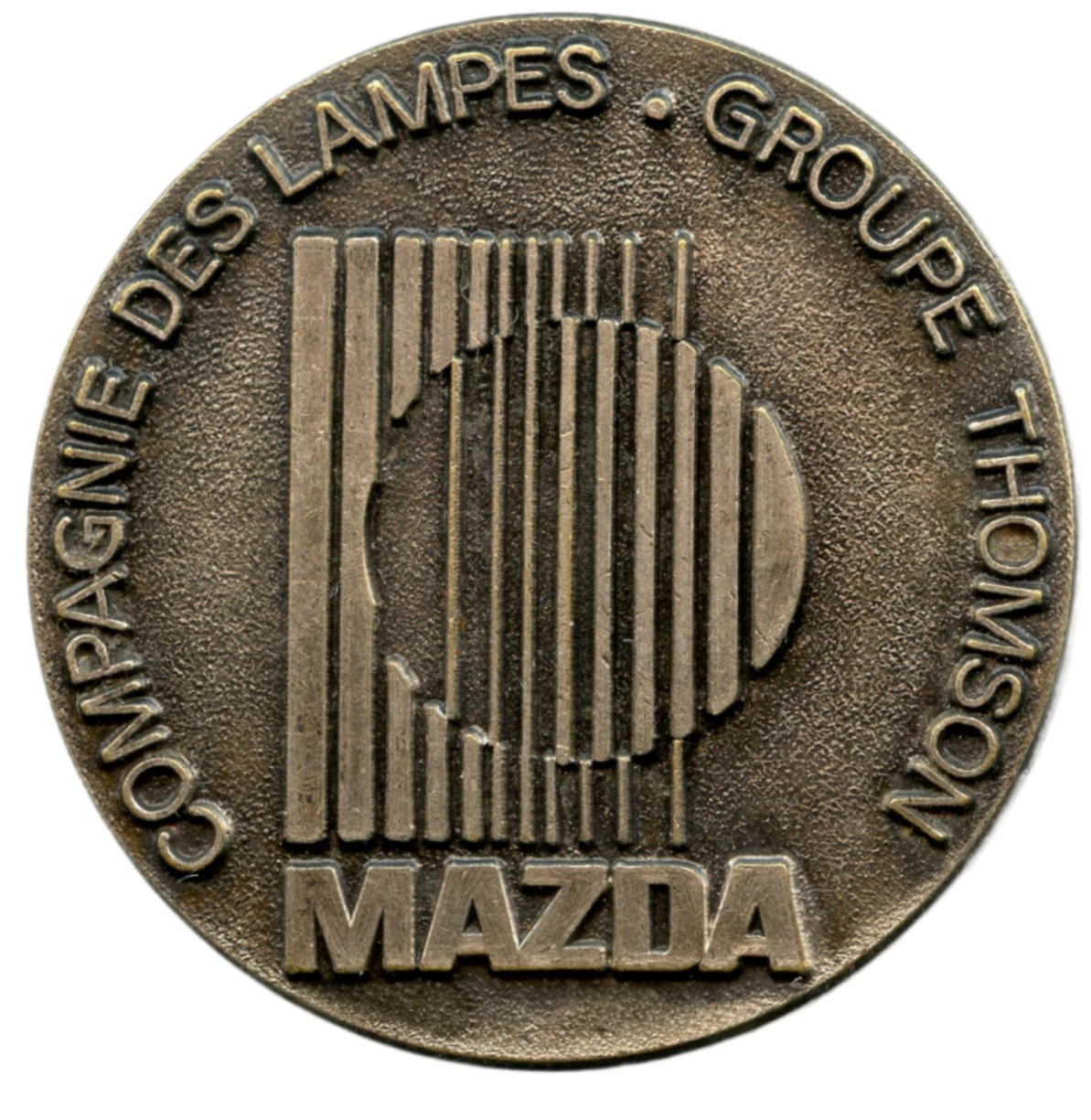
La Compagnie des Lampes, Groupe Thomson badge

La Compagnie des Lampes ("The Lamp Company") was a name used by several French companies all in the area of electrical products particularly lighting.

== La Compagnie des Lampes (1888) ==
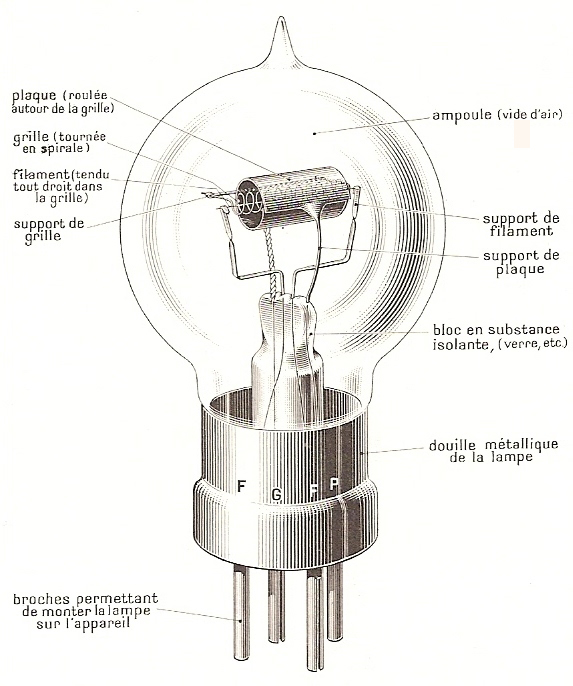
TM tube

The original Compagnie des Lampes was set up at Ivry-sur-Seine in 1888. The plant was subsequently attached to the CGE (Compagnie Générale d'Electricité) on its acquisition in 1898. The plant is classified as a historical monument.

In 1915, the plant was the second to start manufacturing TM triodes ("Télégraphie Militaire") in France, under their Métal brand (the first was E.C.&A. Grammont (Lyon) under their Radio Fotos brand). Later they made tubes for domestic AC transformer heating such as the BW604 and BW1010 under their Métal-Secteur brand.

== La Compagnie des Lampes (1911) ==
Founded in 1911 by Paul Blavier, La Compagnie des Lampes was a light bulb factory workshop, located in Saint-Pierre-Montlimart, near Cholet. The company changed its name in 1918 to become Manufacture de lampes à incandescence, la Française. It was associated with the Thomson group in the 1950s.

== La Compagnie des Lampes (1921) ==
In 1921 CFTH (Compagnie Française Thomson-Houston) and CGE (Compagnie Générale d'Electricité) jointly created a new Compagnie des Lampes. It later became a major player in the field of lighting in France, notably through its brand MAZDA.

Between 1924 and 1939, it was part of the Phoebus cartel, an oligopoly that dominated the market for light bulbs while putting in place an agreement on the principle of planned obsolescence for their products.

Besides light bulbs (and like British Ediswan), CdL (1921) also made vacuum tubes under the Mazda brand, for example 6H8G (1947), 3T100A1 (1949), E1 (1950); since 1953 as LAMPE MAZDA: 2G21 (1953), 927 (1954), EL183 (1959), EF816 (1962).

Many of their tubes were also available from Compagnie Industrielle Française des Tubes Electroniques (CIFTE) under their Mazda-Belvu brand (originating from Societé Radio Belvu, which sold Grammont's Fotos tubes).
