= Mazda (light bulb) =

Brand of lightbulb, from 1909 to 1990

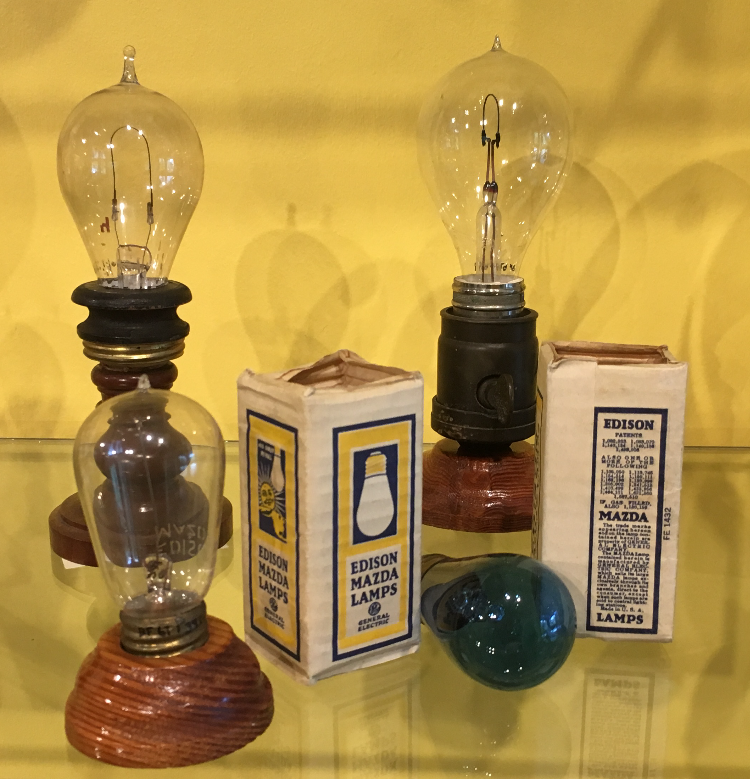
Mazda brand bulbs at the Edison and Ford Winter Estates

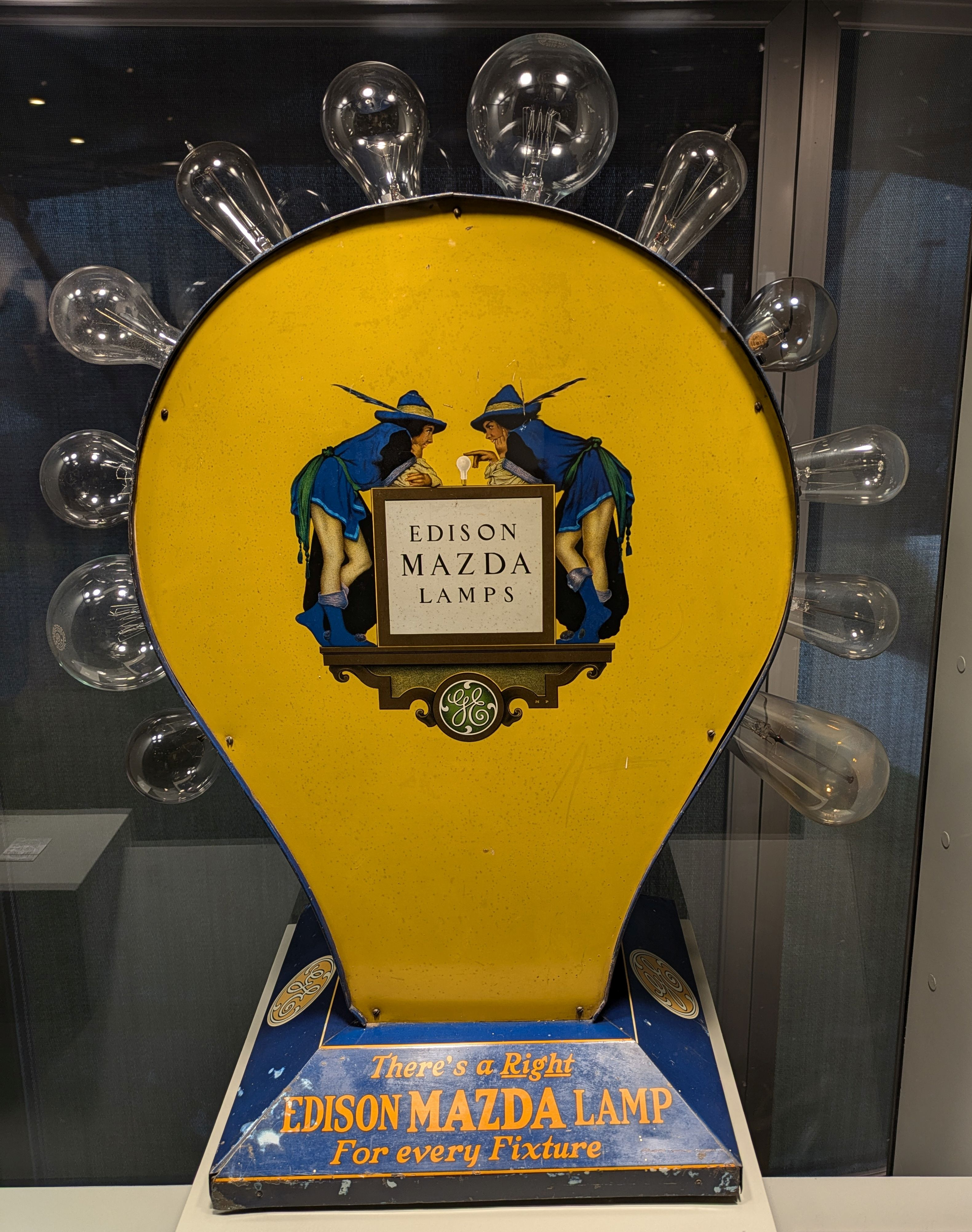
Edison Mazda light bulb tester, logo by Maxfield Parrish, at the Corning Museum of Glass

Mazda was a trademarked name registered by General Electric (GE) in 1909 for incandescent light bulbs. The name was used from 1909 to 1945 in the United States by GE and Westinghouse. Mazda brand light bulbs were made for decades after 1945 outside the US. The company chose the name due to its association with Ahura Mazda, the transcendental and universal God of Zoroastrianism, whose name means light of wisdom in the Avestan language.

In 1909, the Mazda name was created for the tungsten filament light bulb. GE sold bulbs under this trademark starting in 1909. GE promoted the mark as identifying tungsten filament bulbs with predictable performance and life expectancy. GE also licensed the Mazda name, socket sizes, and tungsten filament technology to other manufacturers to establish a standard for lighting. Bulbs were soon sold by many manufacturers with the Mazda name licensed from GE, including British Thomson-Houston in the United Kingdom, Toshiba in Japan, and GE's chief competitor, Westinghouse.

Tungsten-filament bulbs of the Mazda type were initially more costly than carbon-filament-bulbs, but were more efficient. Often, electrical utilities would trade new lamps for consumers' burned-out bulbs. In at least one case, the authority regulating energy rates required the utility to use only tungsten bulbs so as not to inflate customers' energy use.

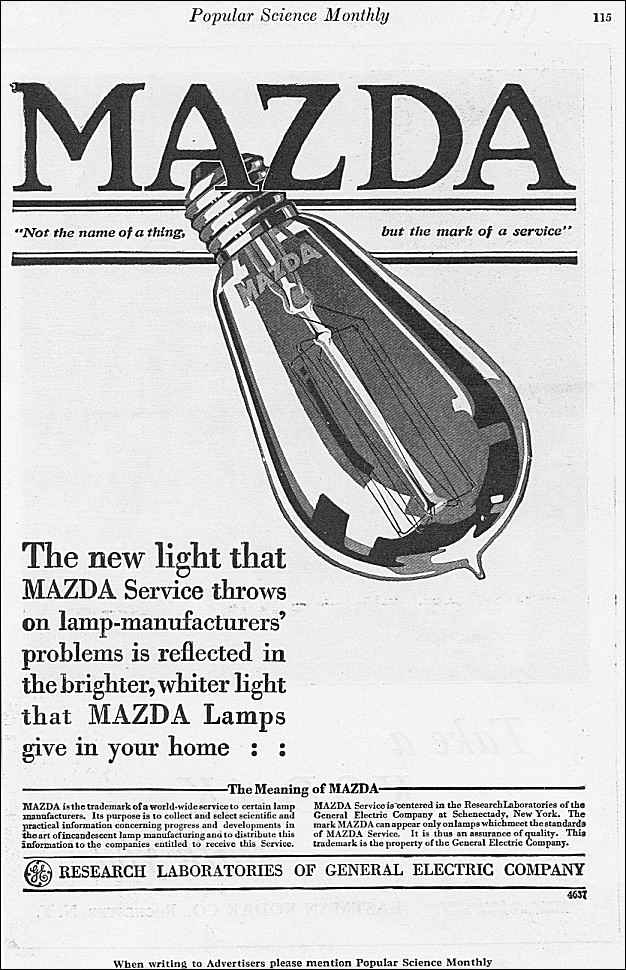
Ad for the Mazda service mark, 1917.

The company dropped the campaign in 1945. GE's patents on the tungsten filament lamp expired in the late 1930s, and other forms of lighting were becoming more important than incandescent bulbs. GE stopped licensing the trademark to other manufacturers, although it continued to renew the trademark registration up to 1990. The registration on trademark no. 77,779 expired in 2000. The modern association of the Mazda name is mostly with the Mazda automobile manufacturer of Japan (which coexisted with Toshiba's Mazda bulbs in its early years).

GE's Mazda bulbs were manufactured by Minneapolis Mazda Lamp Works at a factory in Northeast Minneapolis. From the 1930s until 2012, the building was the headquarters of Minneapolis Public Schools.

== Mazda brand licensees ==
- Westinghouse: Light bulbs
- Ediswan (British Mazda): Light bulbs, vacuum tubes
- Compagnie des Lampes (1921, French Mazda): Light bulbs, vacuum tubes
- Compagnie Industrielle Française des Tubes Electroniques (CIFTE): Mazda-Belvu vacuum tubes (originating from Societé Radio Belvu)
- Manufacture Belge des Lampes Électriques (MBLE),^{(fr, nl)} whose research laboratory was headed by Vitold Belevitch: Light bulbs as Mazda, but vacuum tubes as Adzam ("Mazda" spelled backwards)
- Compagnie Industrielle des Piles Électriques (Mazda-CIPEL): Batteries
- Toshiba (Japanese Mazda): Light bulbs, vacuum tubes

== See also ==
- Edison screw
- Maxfield Parrish, painter, produced many (promotional) works for Mazda and General Electric.
