= Cosima Dannoritzer =

German film director and screenwriter

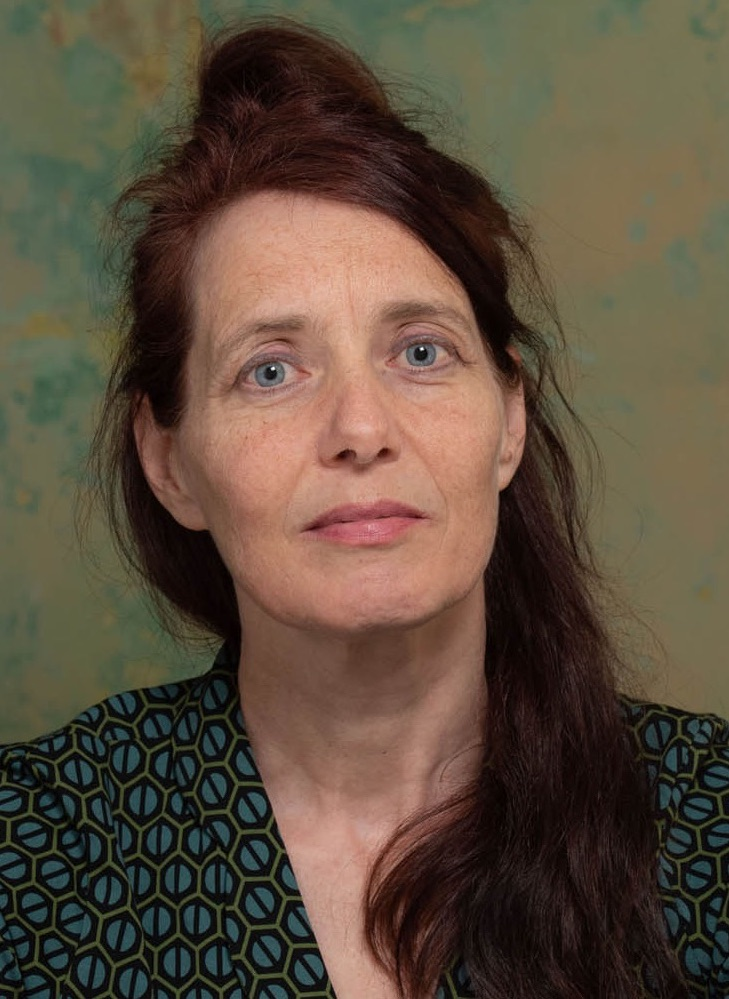
- Born: May 22, 1965 (age 61); Dortmund, Germany
- Education: University of Strathclyde, Bournemouth and Poole College of Art and Design
- Occupation: Documentary filmmaker
- Known for: The Light Bulb Conspiracy
- Website: cosimadannoritzer.com

Cosima Dannoritzer (born May 22, 1965) is a German documentary filmmaker and film producer, whose documentaries focus on science, technology, ecology and history. She became known internationally as the screenwriter and film director of documentary The Light Bulb conspiracy, which looks at the history and impact of planned obsolescence.

== Education ==
Cosima Dannoritzer studied English Literature, Film Studies und Theatre Studies at the University of Strathclyde in Glasgow, Scotland, graduating with a Bachelor of Arts in 1987. In 1989, she obtained the Higher National Diploma in Film & TV Production from the Bournemouth and Poole College of Art and Design in England.

== Career ==
As a freelance and multi-lingual screenwriter and filmmaker (she speaks English, German, French, Spanish and Catalan), Dannoritzer has directed for Arte, the BBC, Channel 4, Radiotelevisión Española and Deutsche Welle TV.

In 1992, she directed a film about the reunification of East and West Berlin for Channel 4's Equinox slot. In 2001, she directed a series about Germany for the BBC.

Since 2011, her documentary The Light Bulb Conspiracy about planned obsolescence has been broadcast in more than a dozen countries, including on Arte, Phoenix and RTVE. The film was also screened as a Side Event during the Green Week of the European Commission in 2011.

Her documentary The E-Waste Tragedy was screened in 2015 at Interpol in Lyon during CWIT, an international conference addressing the problem of illegal e-waste exports.

== Filmography ==
Documentaries

- Allergy Alert: Paranoia in our Immune System (Allergien – wenn der Körper rebelliert; Un Monde d'allergiques), 52 min. (2021)
- Megafires (Megafeuer: Der Planet brennt; Incendies géants : enquête sur un nouveau fléau), 90 min. (2019)
- Time Thieves (Zeit ist Geld; Le temps c'est de l'argent; Ladrones de tiempo), 85 min. (2018)
- The E-Waste Tragedy (Giftige Geschäfte – Der Elektromüllskandal; La tragédie électronique), 86 min. (2014)
- The Light Bulb conspiracy (Kaufen für die Müllhalde; Prêt à jeter; Comprar, tirar, comprar), 75 min. (2010)
- Electronic Amnesia (L'Amnèsia Electrònica), 25 min. (2006)
- The Case Comas & Prió (El cas Comas i Prió), 25 min. (2004)
- If Rubbish Could Speak (El Que La Brossa Ens Diu), 25 min. (2003)
- Germany Inside Out, five-part series for the BBC and Yleisradio/YLE, Finland (2001)
- Life Is But A Game (Das Leben ist ein Spiel), 30 min. (1995)
- In the Sign of the Bear (Im Zeichen des Bären), 30 min. (1995)
- Rebuilding Berlin (Channel 4), 52 min. (1992)

Fiction

- My Brother Tom (Associate Producer, FilmFour UK, 2000)

Freelance contributions to magazine programmes

- Noah (ecology magazine, Deutsche Welle TV, 1995–1997)
- Einstein (science magazine, Sender Freies Berlin (SFB), 1993/1994)

== Awards ==
Cosima Dannoritzer has received numerous international awards for her documentaries.

- 2020: "Best Environmental Documentary", RushDoc Film Festival for Megafires
- 2019: "Best International TV Production", DocsBarcelona and "Best Editing", United Nations Association Film Festival (UNAFF), USA, for Time Thieves
- 2015: Golden Award / Prix Italia for The E-Waste Tragedy
- 2010–2013: Eleven international festival awards for The Light Bulb Conspiracy, including "Best Documentary" at the Spanish Television Academy Awards (2011) and the Hoimar-von-Ditfurth-Prize for "Best journalistic achievement" (Deutsche Umwelthilfe, 2013)
- 1993: "Journalism Prize" of the German-British Society for Rebuilding Berlin

== Membership ==
Dannoritzer is a member of the European Film Academy.

== Publications ==
Three years after the premiere of The Light Bulb Conspiracy, the book to the film was published in Germany:

- Cosima Dannoritzer, Jürgen Reuß: Kaufen für die Müllhalde. Das Prinzip der geplanten Obsoleszenz, orange-press, Freiburg 2013, ISBN 978-3-936086-66-9.
