= Obsolescence =

State of being obsolete

Obsolescence is the process of becoming antiquated, out of date, old-fashioned, no longer in general use, no longer useful, or superseded by innovation, or the condition of being in such a state. When used in a biological sense, it means imperfect or rudimentary when compared with the corresponding part of other organisms. The international standard IEC 62402:2019 Obsolescence Management defines obsolescence as the "transition from available to unavailable from the manufacturer in accordance with the original specification".

Obsolescence frequently occurs because a replacement has become available that has, in sum, more advantages compared to the disadvantages incurred by maintaining or repairing the original. Obsolete also refers to something that is already disused or discarded, or antiquated. Typically, obsolescence is preceded by a gradual decline in popularity.

== Consequences ==
Driven by rapid technological changes, new components are developed and launched on the market with increasing speed. The result is a dramatic change in production methods of all components and their market availability. A growing industry sector is facing issues where life cycles of products no longer fit together with life cycles of required components. This issue is known as obsolescence, the status given to a part when it is no longer available from its original manufacturer. The problem of obsolescence is most prevalent for electronics technology, wherein the procurement lifetimes for microelectronic parts are often significantly shorter than the manufacturing and support life cycles for the products that use the parts. However, obsolescence extends beyond electronic components to other items, such as materials, textiles, and mechanical parts. In addition, obsolescence has been shown to appear for software, specifications, standards, processes, and soft resources, such as human skills. It is highly important to implement and operate an active management of obsolescence to mitigate and avoid extreme costs.

== Types ==
=== Technical obsolescence ===
Technical obsolescence usually occurs when a new product or technology supersedes the old one, and it is preferred to use the new technology instead. Historical examples of new technologies superseding old ones include bronze replacing flint in hand-tools, DVDs replacing videocassettes, and the telephone replacing the telegraph. On a smaller scale, a particular product may become obsolete when a newer version replaces it. Many products in the computer industry become obsolete in this manner. For example, central processing units (CPUs) frequently become obsolete in favor of newer, faster units. Singularly, rapid obsolescence of data formats along with their supporting hardware and software can lead to loss of critical information, a process known as digital obsolescence.

In many cases, a new technology does not totally replace the old technology because the old technology is still useful in certain applications. For example, transistors replaced vacuum tubes in TV and radio receivers in the 1960s, but vacuum tubes were still used for powerful transmitters because transistors for these power levels were not available. Even today, one has to use multiple transistors for a purpose that used to require just one tube.

Products may also become obsolete when supporting technologies are no longer available to produce or even repair a product. For example, many integrated circuits, including CPUs, memory and even some relatively simple logic chips may no longer be produced because the technology has been superseded, their original developer has gone out of business or a competitor has bought them out and effectively killed off their products to remove competition. It is rarely worth redeveloping a product to get around these issues since its overall functionality and price/performance ratio has usually been superseded by that time as well.

Some products become technologically obsolete due to changes in complementary products which results in the function of the first product being made unnecessary. For example, buggy whips became obsolete when people started to travel in cars rather than in horse-drawn buggies.

=== Functional obsolescence ===
Items become functionally obsolete when they can no longer adequately perform the function for which they were created. For example, while one could theoretically adapt an Avro Lancaster to deploy modern JDAM bombs, the situations in which it could actually succeed at doing so against modern air defenses would be so few that it would be essentially useless.

Manufacturers and repair companies will typically cease support for products once they become obsolete as keeping production lines in place and parts in storage for a shrinking user base becomes unprofitable. This causes scarcity of spare parts and skilled technicians for repairs and thus escalates maintenance costs for obsolete products. This ultimately leads to prohibitive expense in keeping old technology functioning.

Ending the Depression Through Planned Obsolescence by Bernard London, 1932

=== Architectural obsolescence ===
The term "obsolescence" was first applied to the built environment in 1910 in an attempt to explain American skyscrapers' sudden loss of value. New York engineer Reginald P. Bolton attributed this phenomenon to "something new and better out-competing the old" and calculated the average architectural lifespan of varying building types in order to formulate a rough estimate for their impending obsolescence. For example, he suggested that hotels' obsolescence will occur faster than banks due to their ever-changing functions and tastes.

=== Planned obsolescence ===
Sometimes marketers deliberately introduce obsolescence into their product strategy, with the objective of generating long-term sales volume by reducing the time between repeat purchases. One example might be producing an appliance which is deliberately designed to wear out within five years of its purchase, pushing consumers to replace it within five years.

=== Inventory obsolescence ===
Inventory obsolescence occurs when retailers and other vendors hold stocks for anticipated future sales which turn out to be too slow to materialise. Holding excessive levels of stock or over-predicting potential demand increase the risks of products becoming obsolete and have a detrimental effect on the organisation's cash flow. Companies may address this problem alongside a periodic stock count by assessing which of their stock items are slow-moving or not selling at all.

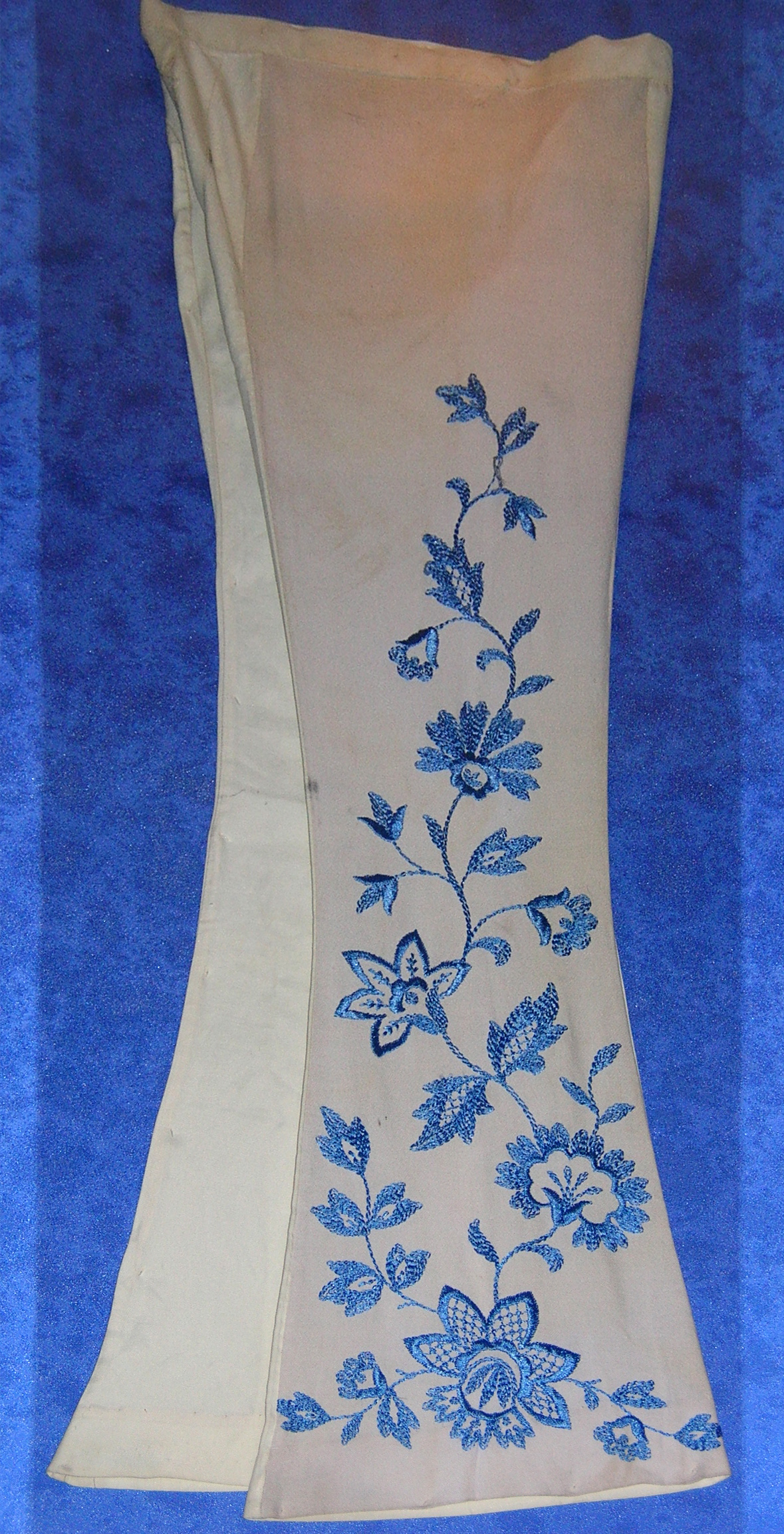
Jimi Hendrix's bell-bottoms

=== Style obsolescence ===
When a product is no longer desirable because it has gone out of the popular fashion, its style is obsolete. One example is flared leg jeans; although this article of clothing may still be perfectly functional, it is no longer desirable because style trends have moved away from the flared leg cut.

Because of the "fashion cycle", stylistically obsolete products may eventually regain popularity and cease to be obsolete. An example is "acid-wash" jeans, which were popular in the 1980s, became stylistically obsolete in the mid to late 1990s, and returned to popularity in the 2000s.

=== Moral obsolescence ===
Moral obsolescence may be described as the erosion or deprecation of values and principles for the sake of convenience, due to social pressure, marketing, or collective habit. Hyperconsumerism may require a person to forsake formerly held values or preferred principles when discarding products for non‑functional reasons, which contributes to waste. Passively accepting planned obsolescence reflects on deeper issues in the consumer's economic and ethical awareness. Consumers generally do not have any knowledge of production conditions or the ecological consequences of production.

=== Obsolescence management ===
Obsolescence management, also referred to as "Diminishing Manufacturing Sources and Material Shortages" (DMSMS), is defined as to the activities that are undertaken to mitigate the effects of obsolescence. Activities can include last-time buys, lifetime buys, and obsolescence monitoring.

== See also ==
- Commodification
- Deprecation
- Disruptive innovation
- List of archaic technological nomenclature
- Moore's law
- Skeuomorph
- Sustainable design
