= Pentalobe screw =

Tamper-resistant screw

- Pentalobe screw diagram
- Inception: 2009
- Manufacturer: Apple
- Notes; Tamper resistant screw

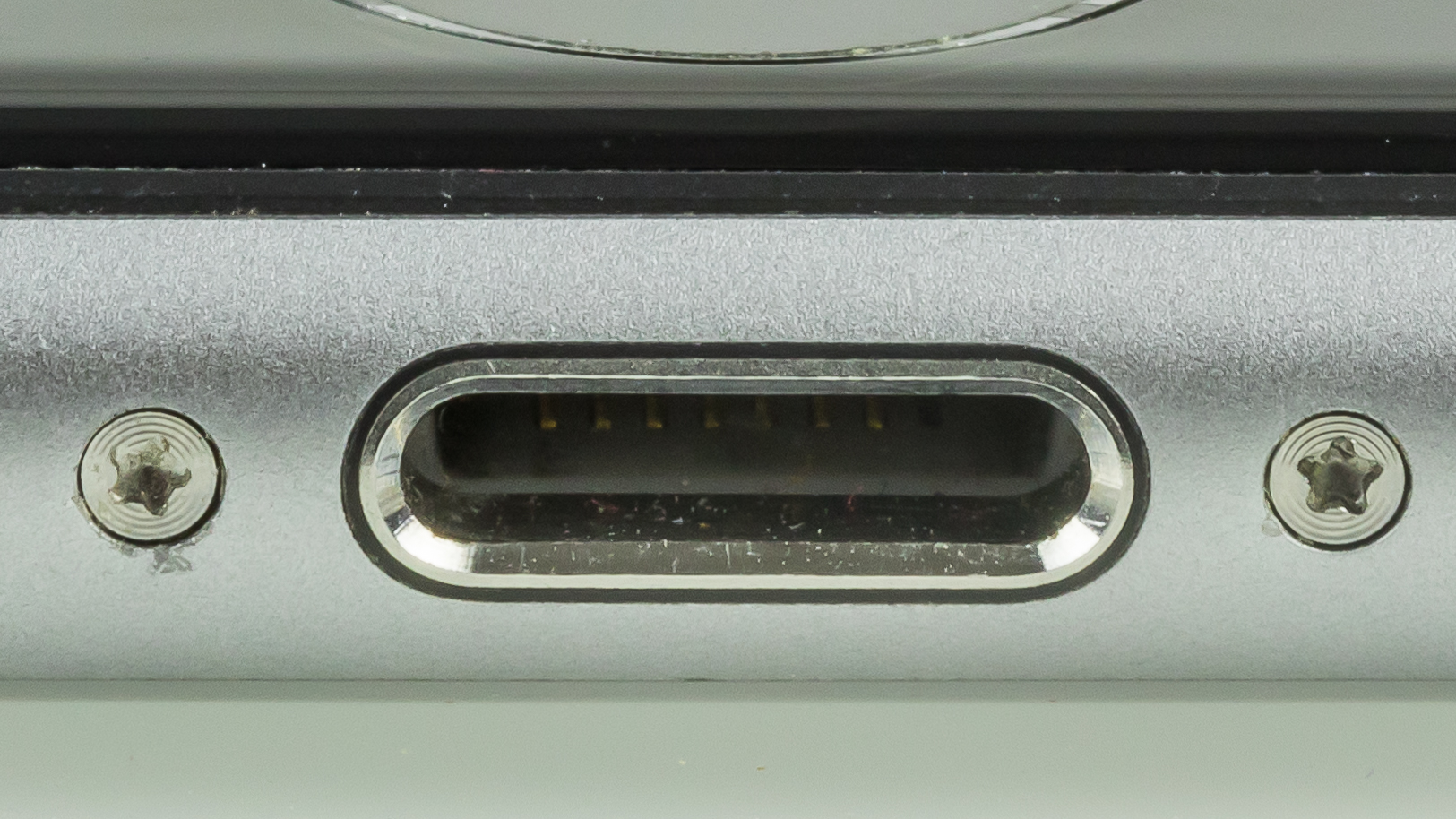
Two pentalobe screws left and right of the lightning connector of an iPhone 6S Plus

The pentalobe security screw (Apple nomenclature), or pentalobe screw drive, is a five-pointed tamper-resistant system used by companies including Apple in their products. Pentalobe screws were adopted by Apple starting in 2009, when they were first used in the 15-inch MacBook Pro. They have since been used on other MacBook Pro, MacBook Air and iPhone models. Apple attracted criticism upon the introduction of the pentalobe screw; it was seen by some as an attempt to lock individuals out of their devices. In response, inexpensive pentalobe screwdrivers, manufactured by third parties, have become relatively easy to obtain. According to right-to-repair parts and tools supplier iFixit, "the pentalobe tends to be inferior to other screws [due to its] shallow draft that makes the screw prone to stripping out".

Pentalobe screw sizes include TS1 (0.8 mm, used on every iPhone starting with the iPhone 4s), TS4 (1.2 mm, used on the MacBook Air and the MacBook Pro with Retina display), and TS5 (1.5 mm, used on the 2009 MacBook Pro battery). The TS designation is ambiguous as it is also used for the Torq-set screw drive.

== Usage ==
=== iPod ===
Various models of the iPod Classic include pentalobe screws on its Toshiba hard drive.

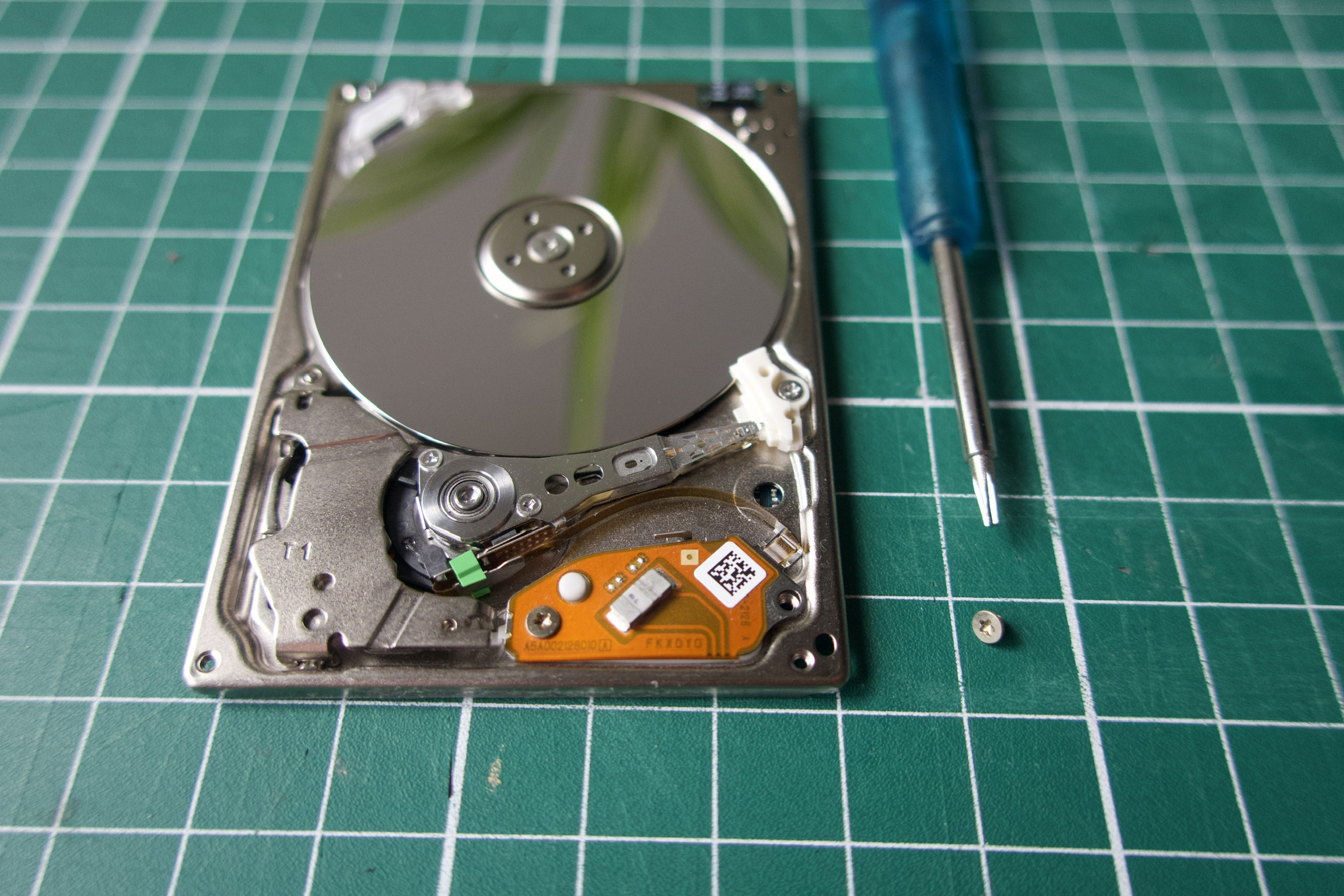
An example of a 2007 iPod classic Toshiba hard drive pentalobe screw

=== MacBook Pro ===
The first Apple product to include pentalobe screws internally was the Mid 2009 MacBook Pro 15-inch model. Three pentalobe screws were used to attach the battery to the internal frame. A 1.5 mm flat-blade (slotted) screwdriver could easily remove these screws, which were originally mistaken for 5-point Torx screws. This was the only internal usage of pentalobe screws; all following MacBook Pros use the "Tri-Wing" security bit to attach the battery to the internal frame, or else have glued-in batteries.

Pentalobe screws reappeared in the mid-2012 version of the MacBook Pro. Eight 3 mm and two 2.3 mm pentalobe screws were used externally to attach the bottom plate of the case to the internal frame. The late-2012 version of the 13-inch MacBook Pro was the first 13-inch model to have pentalobe screws; several were used externally in a similar fashion to the 15-inch mid-2012 MacBook Pro. None of the three 17-inch models of the MacBook Pro have used any pentalobe screws.

=== MacBook Air ===
The MacBook Air has seen more extensive use of pentalobe screws than the MacBook Pro. All five versions of the 11-inch MacBook Air (late-2010, mid-2011, mid-2012, mid-2013 and early-2014) include eight 2.5 mm-long and two 8 mm-long external pentalobe screws. The last five versions of the 13-inch MacBook Air (late-2010, mid-2011, mid-2012, mid-2013 and early-2014) use eight 2.6 mm-long and two 9 mm-long pentalobe screws. Pentalobe screws have been used only externally on MacBook Air models.

Third-party manufacturers have marketed a variety of 5-point screwdrivers that fit pentalobe screws on MacBook models since pentalobe screws first appeared externally in the late-2010 MacBook Air.

=== iPhones ===
The original iPhone had no screws holding the body together. The iPhone 3G and the iPhone 3GS had two #00 Phillips screws next to the 30-pin Dock Connector.

Pentalobe screws were first used in the iPhone 4. At first, #00 Phillips screws were used, but later iPhone 4 models had pentalobe screws. The screws used were slightly smaller than a Torx TS1, about 0.8 mm. If brought in to an Apple Store for repair, iPhone 4 models with #00 Phillips screws, if any, were replaced with 0.8 mm pentalobe screws. Third-party manufacturers rushed to produce screwdrivers that would remove 0.8 mm pentalobe screws after the iPhone 4's release in June 2010. These inexpensive, easily purchased drivers will remove pentalobe screws quite easily. Many are sold as "kits" containing a 5-point driver and Phillips #00 screws, in order to replace pentalobe screws with easily removable Phillips screws. Most other security screwdrivers will strip the miniature heads, effectively locking the user out of their device.

All iPhone 4S models contain identical pentalobe screws to those found on the iPhone 4. The iPhone 5 has very similar 0.8 mm pentalobe screws, but the screws have longer 3.6 mm shafts.

=== Non-Apple manufacturers ===
Sony used 5-point pentalobe screws (though mostly simply referred as "star shaped" screws pre-dating the currently accepted name) on its Sony CLIÉ UX Series PDAs in 2003.

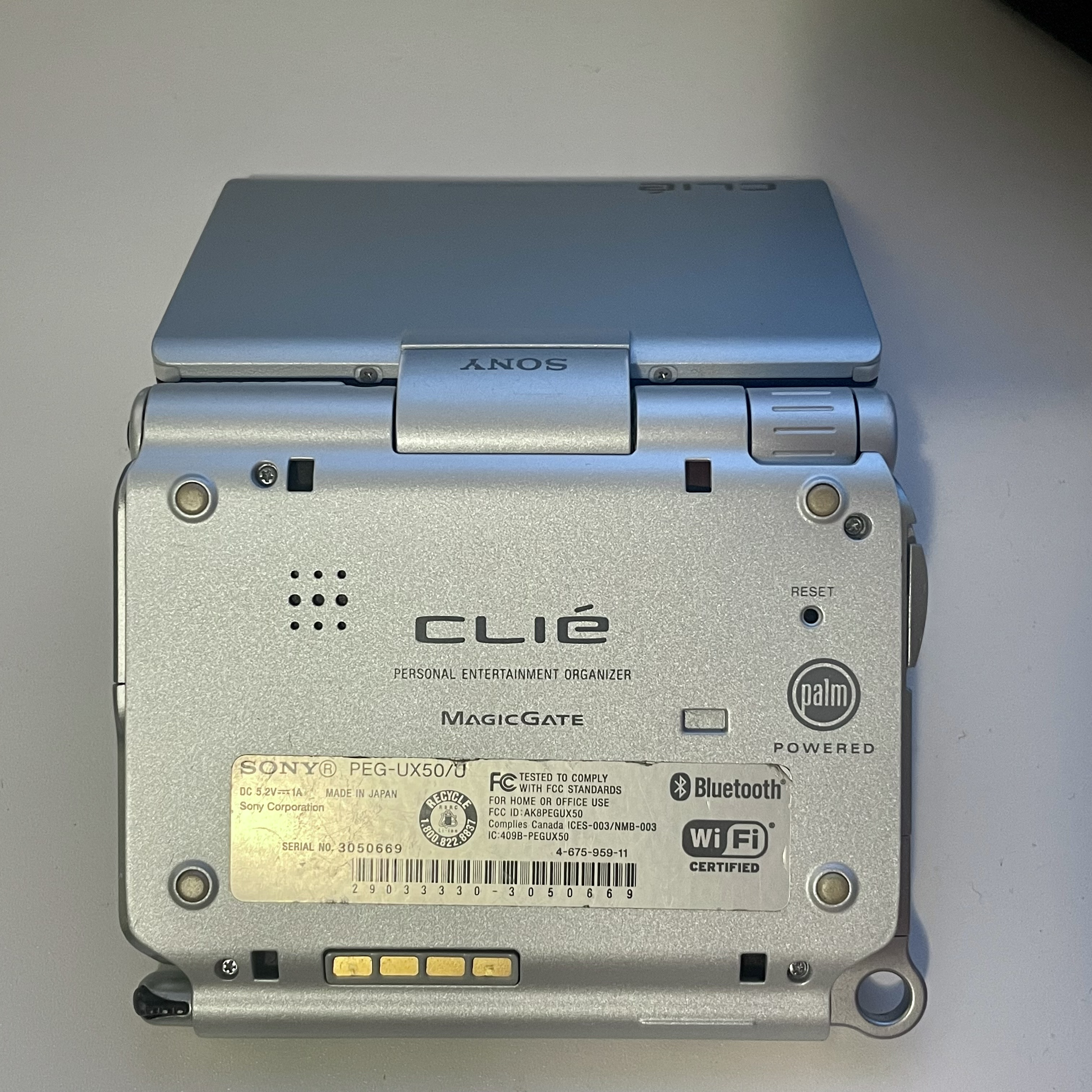
Pentalobe screws were used on the underside of the Sony CLIÉ PEG-UX50 PDA.

Huawei used pentalobe screws for the Huawei P9, a decision criticised by Kyle Wiens writing for Wired, because using pentalobe screws instead of standard screws like Torx makes electronics more difficult to repair. Its successor, the Huawei P10, also used pentalobe screws to secure the back cover to the phone.

Like Huawei P9, Meizu MX9 also uses the pentalobe screw next to the USB-C connector.

=== Sizes and measurements ===
Although there is no (known) official standard naming scheme, the size is commonly known as P-sizes. TS-sizes are sometimes used, but leave room for mixing up with regular Torq-set sizes. The following P and TS sizes are used by iFixit.com, and PL sizes by Wiha, a German tool company:

Pentalobe sizes
P sizes	TS sizes	PL sizes	Dimension	Usage
P1	TS0		Unknown	
P2	TS1	PL1	0.8 mm	iPhone 4 (Late) - iPhone 17, Huawei P9, MacBook Pro 15" 2018 (battery)
P3	TS2		Unknown	
		PL2	0.9 mm	Apple Watch Band, M1.2 thread
P4	TS3		Unknown	
		PL3	1.1 mm	
P5	TS4	PL4	1.2 mm	MacBook Air and MacBook Pro with Retina Display – known as Part 923-0731 in Apple's repair manuals
P6	TS5	PL5	1.5 mm	MacBook Pro (2009) Battery (15-inch only) – known as Apple specialty tool 922-9101
		PL6	1.6 mm	

These pentalobe, 5 point heads are not to be confused with Torx heads which have 6 points. A "IPR" designation identical to "PL" is sometimes seen due to the confusion. It is possible that ambiguous "TS" nomenclature is the same as the "PL" designation when referring to Pentalobe screws.

Apple simply refers to the screws by their millimeter dimensions. For example, the PL2 screw used on the lugs that hold the Apple Watch Band is called "Pentalobe 1.1".
