= Planned obsolescence =

Product design with limited useful life

In economics and industrial design, planned obsolescence (also called built-in obsolescence or premature obsolescence) is the concept of policies planning or designing a product with an artificially limited useful life or a purposely frail design, so that it becomes obsolete after a certain predetermined period of time upon which it decrementally functions or suddenly ceases to function, or might be perceived as unfashionable.

Once regarded as a conspiracy theory, the rationale behind this strategy is to generate long-term sales volume by reducing the time between repeat purchases (referred to as "shortening the replacement cycle"). It is the deliberate shortening of the lifespan of a product to force people to purchase functional replacements.

Planned obsolescence tends to work best when a producer has at least an oligopoly. Before introducing a planned obsolescence, the producer has to know that the customer is at least somewhat likely to buy a replacement from them, for example due to brand loyalty. In these cases of planned obsolescence, there is an information asymmetry between the producer, who knows how long the product was designed to last, and the customer, who does not. When a market becomes more competitive, product lifespans tend to increase.

For example, when Japanese vehicles with longer lifespans entered the American market in the 1960s and 1970s, American carmakers were forced to respond by building more durable products.

== History ==
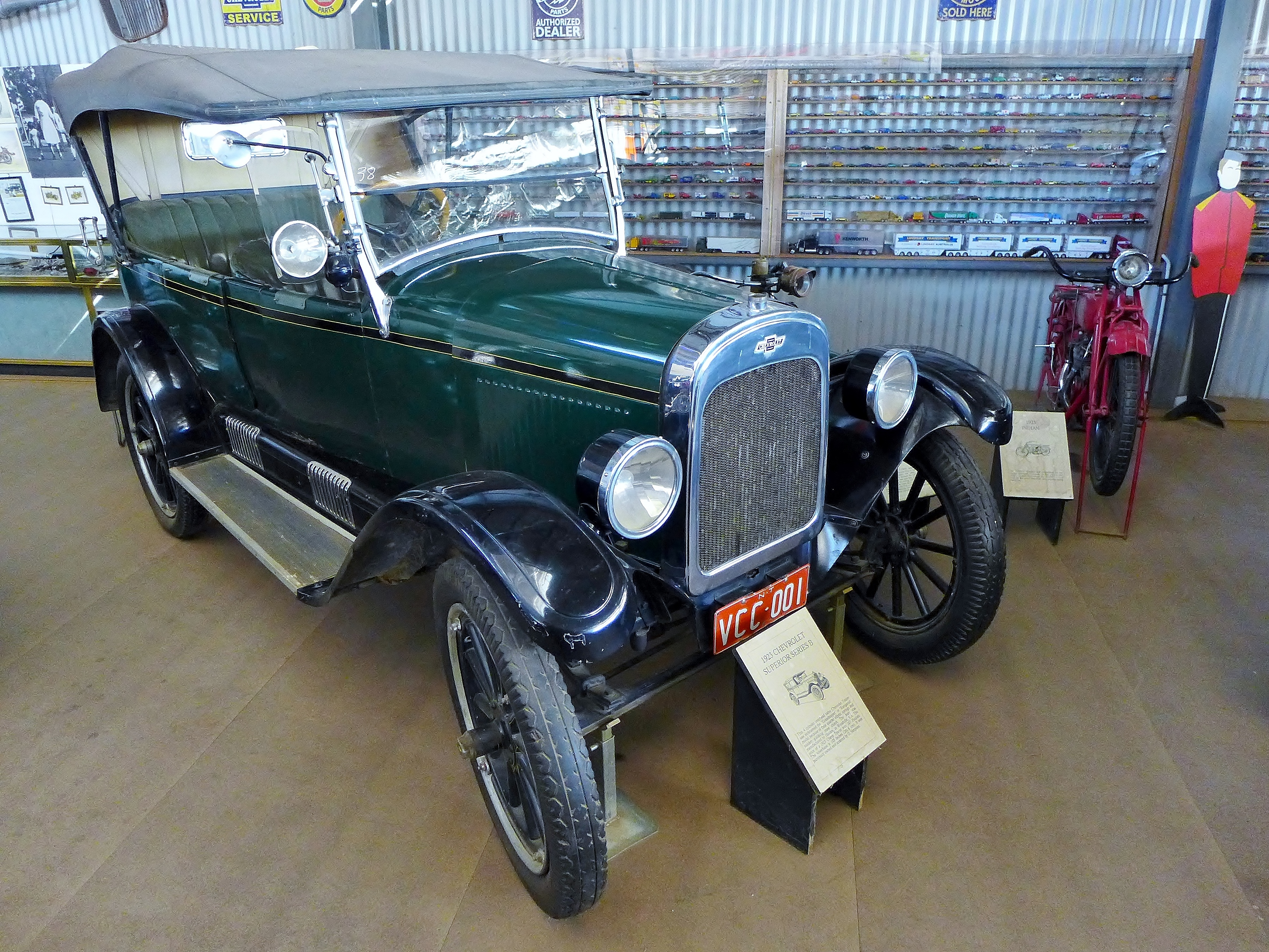
The 1923 Chevrolet is cited as one of the earliest examples of annual facelifts in the car industry because it had a restyled body covering what essentially was nine-year-old technology.

Ending the Depression Through Planned Obsolescence, by Bernard London, 1932

In 1924, the American automobile market began reaching saturation point. To maintain unit sales, General Motors executive Alfred P. Sloan Jr. suggested annual model-year design changes to convince car owners to buy new replacements each year, with refreshed appearances headed by Harley Earl and the Art and Color Section. Although his concept was borrowed from the bicycle industry, its origin was often misattributed to Sloan. Sloan often used the term dynamic obsolescence, but critics coined the name of his strategy planned obsolescence.

This strategy had far-reaching effects on the automobile industry, product design field and eventually the whole American economy. The smaller players could not maintain the pace and expense of yearly re-styling. Henry Ford did not like the constant stream of model-year changes because he clung to an engineer's notions of simplicity, economies of scale, and design integrity. GM surpassed Ford's sales in 1931 and became the dominant company in the industry thereafter. The frequent design changes also made it necessary to use a body-on-frame structure rather than the lighter, but less easy to modify, unibody design used by most European automakers.

The origin of the phrase planned obsolescence goes back at least as far as 1932 with Bernard London's pamphlet Ending the Depression Through Planned Obsolescence. The essence of London's plan would have the government impose a legal obsolescence on personal-use items, to stimulate and perpetuate purchasing. However, the phrase was first popularized in 1954 by Brooks Stevens, an American industrial designer. Stevens was due to give a talk at an advertising conference in Minneapolis in 1954. Without giving it much thought, he used the term as the title of his talk. From that point on, "planned obsolescence" became Stevens' catchphrase. By his definition, planned obsolescence was "Instilling in the buyer the desire to own something a little newer, a little better, a little sooner than is necessary."

The phrase was quickly taken up by others, but Stevens' definition was challenged. By the late 1950s, planned obsolescence had become a commonly used term for products designed to break easily or to quickly go out of style. In fact, the concept was so widely recognized that in 1959 Volkswagen mocked it in an advertising campaign. While acknowledging the widespread use of planned obsolescence among automobile manufacturers, Volkswagen pitched itself as an alternative. "We do not believe in planned obsolescence", the ads suggested. "We don't change a car for the sake of change." In the famous Volkswagen advertising campaign by Doyle Dane Bernbach, one advert showed an almost blank page with the strapline "No point in showing the 1962 Volkswagen, it still looks the same".

In 1960, the critic Vance Packard published The Waste Makers, described as an exposé of "the systematic attempt of business to make us wasteful, debt-ridden, permanently discontented individuals". Packard divided planned obsolescence into two sub categories: obsolescence of desirability and obsolescence of function.

"Obsolescence of desirability", also known as "psychological obsolescence", referred to marketers' attempts to wear out a product in the owner's mind. Packard quoted industrial designer George Nelson, who wrote:

Design ... is an attempt to make a contribution through change. When no contribution is made or can be made, the only process available for giving the illusion of change is "styling"!

== Variants ==
There are several variants of planned obsolescence. They are listed in the order of increasing severity:

=== Contrived durability ===
Contrived durability is a strategy of shortening the product lifetime before it is released onto the market, by designing it to deteriorate quickly. The design of all personal-use products includes an expected average lifetime permeating all stages of development. Thus, it must be decided early in the design of a complex product how long it should last so that each component can be made to those specifications. Due to natural degradation, most products will ultimately break down, no matter what steps are taken. Limited lifespan is only a sign of planned obsolescence if the limit is made artificially short.

The strategy of contrived durability is generally not prohibited by law, and manufacturers are free to set the durability level of their products. While often considered planned obsolescence, it is often argued as its own field of anti-customer practices.

A possible method of limiting a product's durability is to use inferior materials in critical areas, or suboptimal component layouts which cause excessive wear. Using soft metal in screws and cheap plastic instead of metal in stress-bearing components will increase the speed at which a product will become inoperable through normal usage and make it prone to breakage from even minor forms of abnormal usage.

For example, small, brittle plastic gears in toys are extremely prone to damage if the toy is played with roughly, which can easily destroy key functions of the toy and force the purchase of a replacement. The short life expectancy of smartphones and other handheld electronics is a result of constant usage, fragile batteries, and the ability to easily damage them.

==== Batteries ====
Throughout normal use, batteries lose their ability to store energy, output power, and maintain a stable terminal voltage, which impairs computing speeds and eventually leads to system outages in portable electronics.

Some portable products highly relied upon in the post-PC era, such as mobile phones, laptops, as well as electric toothbrushes, are designed in a way that denies end-users the ability to replace their batteries after those have worn down, therefore leaving an aging battery trapped inside the device, which limits the product lifespan to its shortest-lived component.

While such a design can help make the device thinner, it makes it difficult to replace the battery without sending the entire device away for repairs or purchasing an entirely new device. On a device with a sealed back cover, a manual battery replacement might induce permanent damage, including loss of water-resistance due to damages on the water-protecting seal, as well as risking serious, even irreparable damage to the phone's main board as a result of having to pry the battery free from strong adhesive in proximity to delicate components. Some devices are even built so that the battery terminals are covered by the main board, requiring it to be riskily removed entirely before disconnecting the terminals.

The practice in phone design started with Apple's iPhones and has now spread to most other mobile phones with, as of 2022, the exception of Fairphone and Shiftphone offerings. Earlier mobile phones (including water-resistant ones) had back covers that could be opened by the user in order to replace the battery. On December 9, 2022, the EU Parliament reached an agreement to require, from 2026, manufacturers to design all electrical appliances sold in the EU (and not used predominantly in wet conditions) so that consumers can easily remove and replace batteries themselves.

=== Prevention of repairs ===
The ultimate examples of such design are single-use versions of traditionally durable goods, such as disposable cameras, where the customer must purchase entire new products after using them just once. Such products are often designed to be difficult to service; for example, electronics may have internal components coated in glue. Manufacturers may make replacement parts either unavailable or so expensive that they make the product uneconomic to repair. For example, Canon and some HP inkjet printers incorporate a replaceable print head which eventually fails. However, the high cost of a replacement forces the owner to scrap the entire device.

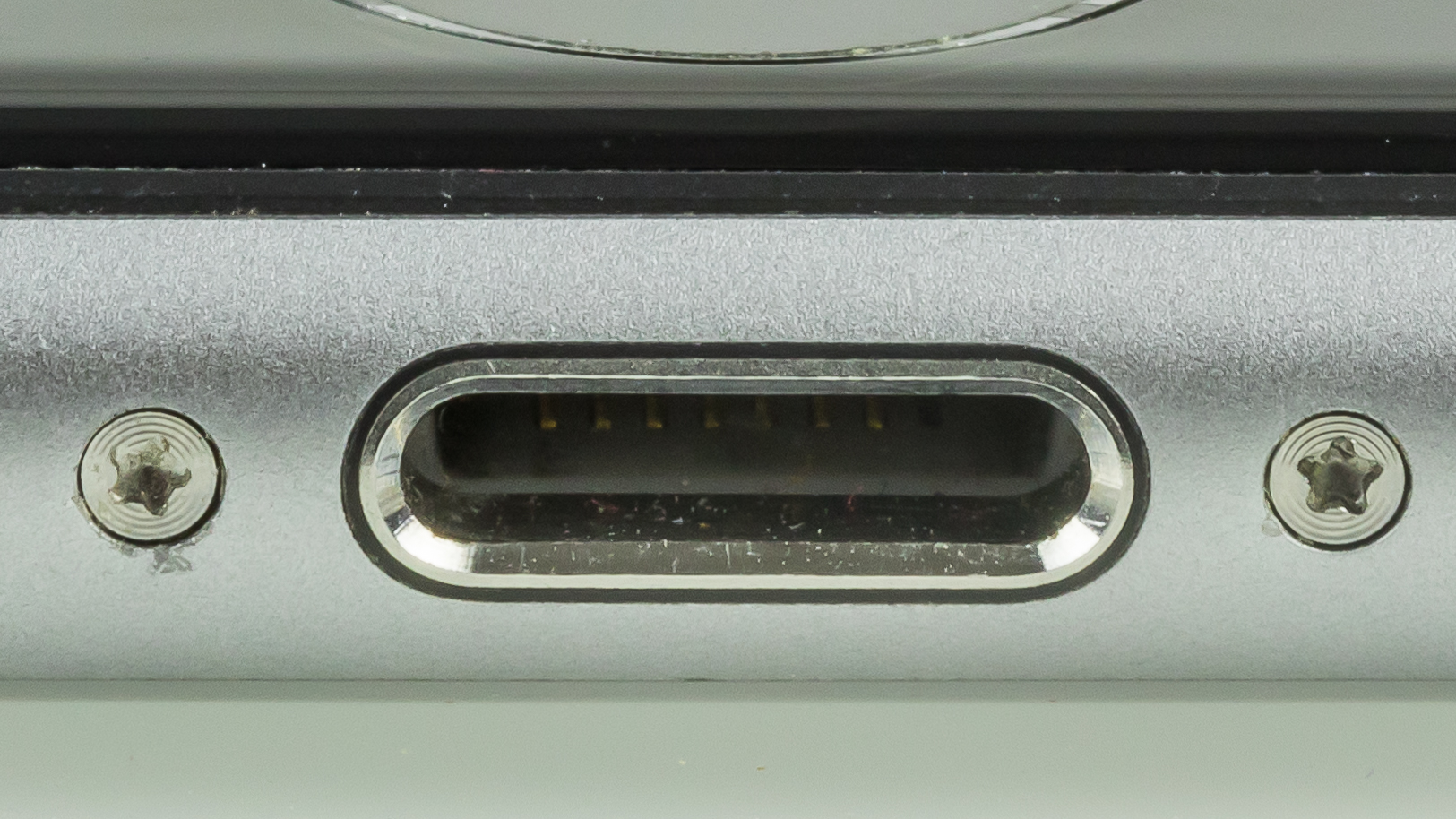
Pentalobe screws used in an iPhone 6S. Critics have argued that Apple's use of pentalobe screws in their newer devices is an attempt to prevent the owner from repairing the device themselves.

Other products may also contain design features meant to frustrate repairs, such as Apple's "tamper-resistant" pentalobe screws that cannot easily be removed with common personal-use tools, overuse of glue, as well as denying operation if any third-party component such as a replacement home button has been detected.

Front loading washing machines often have the drum bearing – a critical and wear-prone mechanical component – permanently molded into the wash drum, or even have a sealed outer drum, making it impossible to renew the bearings without replacing the entire drum. The cost of this repair may exceed the residual value of the appliance, forcing it to be scrapped.

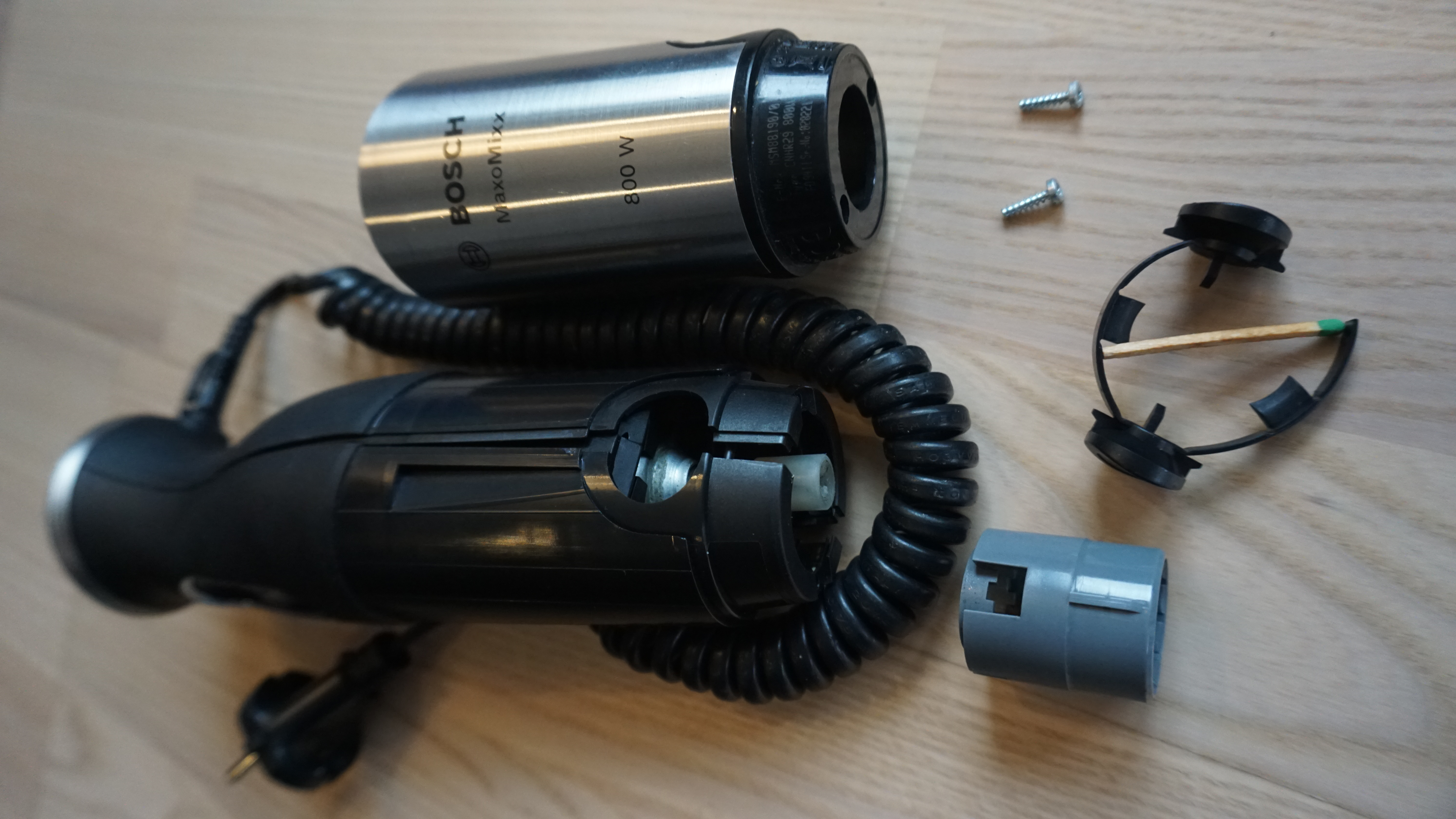
Planned obsolescence in a Bosch immersion blender: a plastic latch (indicated by the head of a match) designed to break after a certain number of deformations, making it difficult to use the blender. All the elements shown in the photo (motor, switch, speed control microprocessor, power cord, etc.) are sold by the Bosch service as "single spare part" for a price similar to the new complete device.

Bosch, despite the up to 10-year availability of spare parts declared on websites, assembles in the popular MaxoMixx mixers an easily breaking plastic latch, refusing to sell the replacement latch to the user and instead proposing to replace the entire drive consisting of many elements as a single spare part, which is almost equivalent to buying a new device.

According to Kyle Wiens, co-founder of online repair community iFixit, a possible goal for such a design is to make the cost of repairs comparable to the replacement cost, or to prevent any form of servicing of the product at all. In 2012, Toshiba was criticized for issuing cease-and-desist letters to the owner of a website that hosted its copyrighted repair manuals, to the detriment of the independent and home repair market.

In Australia in 2021, the Productivity Commission released a report on the whether there were "significant and unnecessary barriers to repair for some products". The report concluded that these barriers did exist, and provided recommendations to the government on how to remedy the situation.

=== Programmed obsolescence ===
In some cases, notification may be combined with deliberate artificial disabling of a functional product to prevent it from working, thus requiring the buyer to purchase a replacement. For example, inkjet printer manufacturers employ smart chips in their ink cartridges to prevent them from being used after a certain threshold (number of pages, time, etc.), even though the cartridge may still contain usable ink or could be refilled (with ink toners, up to 50 percent of the toner cartridge is often still full). This constitutes "programmed obsolescence", in that there is no random component contributing to the decline in function.

In the Jackie Blennis v. HP class action suit, it was claimed that Hewlett-Packard designed certain inkjet printers and cartridges to shut down on an undisclosed expiration date, and at this point customers were prevented from using the ink that remained in the expired cartridge. HP denied these claims, but agreed to discontinue the use of certain messages, and to make certain changes to the disclosures on its website and packaging, as well as compensating affected customers with a total credit of up to $5,000,000 for future purchases from HP.

Samsung produces laser printers that are designed to stop working with a message about imaging drum replacing. There are some workarounds for users, for instance, that will more than double the life of the printer that has stopped with a message to replace the imaging drum.

In 2021, Canon disabled the scanning function of its Canon Pixma MG6320 all-in-one printers whenever an ink cartridge was out of ink. A class action lawsuit was filed by David Learcraft and his law firm Levi & Korsinsky.

==== Software degradation and lock-out ====
Another example of programmed obsolescence is making older versions of software (e.g. Adobe Flash Player or YouTube's Android application) deliberately unserviceable, even though they would still technically, albeit not economically, be able to function as intended.

Where older versions of software contain unpatched security vulnerabilities that could pose a threat, such as banking and payment apps, deliberate lock-out may be a risk-based response by the software vendor to prevent the proliferation of malware in those older versions by forcing users to update or upgrade their software. If the original vendor of the software is no longer in business, then disabling may occur by another software author as in the case of a web browser disabling a plugin. Otherwise, the vendor who owns a software ecosystem may disable an app that does not comply with a key policy or regulation, such as the format of processing of personal data to protect user privacy, though in other cases this does not exclude the possibility of "security reasons" being used for fearmongering, thereby forcing the user to upgrade.

However, because some devices, despite being equipped with appropriate hardware, might not be able to support the newest update without modifications such as custom firmware, this could pose a severe inconvenience and undue stress upon the user. Additionally, updates to newer versions might have introduced undesirable side effects, such as removed features, compulsory changes, or backwards compatibility shortcomings which may be unsolicited and undesired by users.

Software companies sometimes deliberately drop support for older technologies as a calculated attempt to force users to purchase new products to replace those made obsolete. Most proprietary software will ultimately reach an end-of-life point at which the supplier will cease updates and support, usually when and because the cost of code maintenance, testing and support exceed the revenue generated from the old version. As free software and open source software can generally be updated and maintained at lower cost, the end of life date can be much later, and sustained through 3rd-party outsourcing and forking. Software that is abandoned by the manufacturer with regard to manufacturer support is sometimes called abandonware.

== Alternatives ==
=== Perceived obsolescence ===
Obsolescence of desirability or stylistic obsolescence occurs when designers change the styling of products so trendsetting customers will purchase the latest styles. Although similar, it is a result of consumer perception rather than premeditated (planned) by the designer.

Many products are primarily desirable for aesthetic rather than functional reasons. An example of such a product is clothing. Such products experience a cycle of desirability referred to as a "fashion cycle". By continuously introducing new aesthetics, and retargeting or discontinuing older designs, a manufacturer can "ride the fashion cycle", allowing for constant sales despite the original products remaining fully functional. Sneakers are a popular fashion industry where this is prevalent—Nike's Air Max line of running shoes is a prime example where a single model of shoe is often produced for years, but the color and material combination ("colorway") is changed every few months, or different colorways are offered in different markets. This has the upshot of ensuring constant demand for the product, even though it remains fundamentally the same.

Motor vehicle platforms typically undergo a midlife facelift —a primarily cosmetic rather than an engineering change for the purpose of cost effectively increasing customer appeal by making previously manufactured versions of the same fundamental product less desirable, though sometimes these also introduce updated or new powertrains. The simplest way to achieve this outcome is to offer new paint colors, though most automakers will also update the interior and exterior design along it.

To a more limited extent this is also true of some personal-use electronic products, where manufacturers will release slightly updated products at regular intervals and emphasize their value as status symbols. The most notable example among technology products are Apple products. New colorways introduced with iterative "S" generation iPhones (e.g. the iPhone 6S's "Rose Gold") entice people into upgrading and distinguishes an otherwise identical-looking iPhone from the previous year's model.

Some smartphone manufacturers release a marginally updated model every 5 or 6 months compared to the typical yearly cycle, leading to the perception that a one-year-old handset can be up to two generations old. A notable example is OnePlus, known for releasing T-series devices with upgraded specifications roughly 6 months after a major release device. Sony Mobile utilised a similar tactic with its Xperia Z-series smartphones, and Samsung usually releases a Fan Edition (FE) model of its Galaxy phone at the midlife cycle with some less important features omitted and at a lower price point.

== Laws and regulations ==
=== Europe ===
In 2015, the French National Assembly established a fine of up to €300,000 and jail terms of up to two years for manufacturers planning the failure of their products. The rule is relevant not only because of the sanctions that it establishes but also because it is the first time that a legislature recognized the existence of planned obsolescence. These techniques may include "a deliberate introduction of a flaw, a weakness, a scheduled stop, a technical limitation, incompatibility or other obstacles for repair".

In 2015, as part of a larger movement against planned obsolescence across the European Union, France passed legislation requiring that appliance manufacturers and vendors declare the intended product lifespans, and to inform purchasers how long spare parts for a given product will be produced. From 2016, appliance manufacturers are required to repair or replace, free of charge, any defective product within two years from its original purchase date. This effectively creates a mandatory two-year warranty.

The European Union is also addressing the practice. The European Economic and Social Committee (EESC), an advisory body of the EU, announced in 2013 that it was studying "a total ban on planned obsolescence". It said replacing products that are designed to stop working within two or three years of their purchase was a waste of energy and resources and generated pollution.

The EESC organised a round table in Madrid in 2014 on "Best practices in the domain of built-in obsolescence and collaborative consumption" which called for sustainable consumption to be a customer right in EU legislation. Carlos Trias Pinto, president of the EESC's Consultative Commission on Industrial Change supports "the introduction of a labeling system which indicates the durability of a device, so the purchaser can choose whether they prefer to buy a cheap product or a more expensive, more durable product". In 2023, the EU voted to support a directive to ban planned obsolescence. In 2024, the EU Council clarified the liability of retailers with regard to information, unnecessary software upgrades and unjustified obligation to purchase replacement parts from the original manufacturer.

The UK adopted the Ecodesign for Energy-Related Products and Energy Information Regulations 2021 in mid-2021.

=== North America ===
In June 2023, Quebec's Minister of Justice introduced Bill 29: An Act to protect consumers against planned obsolescence and to promote the durability, repairability and maintenance of goods, which proposed amendments to the Consumer Protection Act. Quebec adopted this Bill in October 2023, prohibiting the creation or sale of an item with planned obsolescence through any technique which would reduce its normal operating life.

In the US, planned obsolescence is being tackled through right to repair laws which have been enacted by several states, including California, Minnesota, New York and Colorado. This issue is mainly seen as one of intellectual property rights in areas such as electronics and software.

== Critics and supporters ==
Shortening the replacement cycle has critics and supporters. Philip Kotler argues that: "Much so-called planned obsolescence is the working of the competitive and technological forces in a free society - forces that lead to ever-improving goods and services."

Critics such as Vance Packard argues the process is wasteful and exploits customers. With psychological obsolescence, resources are used up making changes, often cosmetic changes, that are not of great value to the customer. Miles Park advocates new and collaborative approaches between the designer and the purchaser to challenge obsolescence in fast-moving sectors such as personal-use electronics. Some people, such as Ronny Balcaen, have proposed to create a new label to counter the diminishing quality of products due to the planned obsolescence technique.

Joseph Guiltinan talks about planned obsolescence and believes that he can create an example for companies to create products that are less harmful to the environment. However, it is hard to influence what consumers want because of marketing realities. He ultimately argues that marketing scholars have a role to play in helping consumers understand and respond to companies that market themselves as green, as well as government initiatives that encourage consumers to behave in a more environmentally friendly way.

The Environmental Law Institute writes that planned obsolescence "contributes to a culture of wastefulness by perpetuating a 'buy new and buy often' mentality and limiting consumer autonomy to keep products longer by hard-wiring a 'self-destruct' button in products". Bisschop et al. (2022) have said that the practice limits the "usable life of products to bolster private profit at the expense of consumer interests and environmental sustainability", stating it should be considered a corporate crime against the environment.

A way to combat planned obsolescence is through the "cradle to cradle" cycle, which emphasizes and promotes the usage of past materials and the recycling of products. It also keeps materials and production within "an economic loop". Michael Braungart and William McDonough write in Cradle to Cradle: Remaking the Way We Make Things, that the rise in planned obsolescence or a "cradle to grave" manufacturing model "dates to the Industrial Revolution and casts off as much as 90 percent of the materials it uses as waste, much of it toxic". Braungart and McDonough state that because of this "cradle to grave" cycle it is often cheaper to buy a new version of even the most expensive appliance than to track down someone to repair the original item. They describe planned obsolescence as "built-in obsolescence", to last only for a certain period of time, to allow and to encourage the customer to get rid of the thing and buy a new model.

== In academia ==
Russell Jacoby, writing in the 1970s, observed that intellectual production has succumbed to the same pattern of planned obsolescence used by manufacturing enterprises to generate ever-renewed demand for their products.

The application of planned obsolescence to thought itself has the same merit as its application to consumer goods; the new is not only shoddier than the old, it fuels an obsolete social system that staves off its replacement by manufacturing the illusion that it is perpetually new.

== See also ==
- Artificial demand – Creation of economic demand by deliberately influencing consumers
- Bathtub curve – a concept of typical product failure
- Batterygate – a term used to describe the implementation of performance controls on older models of Apple's iPhone line in order to preserve system stability on degraded batteries
- Crippleware – Product with intentionally limited features in favor of a more expensive version
- Criticism of capitalism – Arguments against the economic system of capitalism
- Defective by Design – Anti-DRM initiative
- Design life – Time the creator plans a product to last
- Disposable product
- Durable good – Good that has long term use
- Durapolist – producer that manipulates the durability of its product
- Durability – Ability of a product to continue to function
- Enshittification – Decline in online platform quality
- Environmental effects of transport
- Interchangeable parts – Practically identical components
- Light-weight Linux distribution – Linux distributions with lower hardware demands than other Linux distributions
- Maintainability – Ease of maintaining a functioning product or service
- Phoebus cartel – worked to standardize the life expectancy of light bulbs at 1,000 hours, down from 2,500 hours
- Prognostics – engineering discipline focused on predicting the life times
- Repairability – Ease of fixing a product defect
- Right to repair – Legal right and movement
- Software bloat – successive versions of a computer program requiring ever more computing power
- Sony timer – urban legend alleging that Sony deliberately rigged their products to fail at a certain time
- Surplus economics - the production paradox: successful production satisfies demand, which undermines the need for further production.
- The Waste Makers – 1960 book by Vance Packard
- Vendor lock-in – making a customer dependent on a vendor for products and services, unable to use another vendor without substantial switching costs.
