= By-product =

Secondary product of an item or process

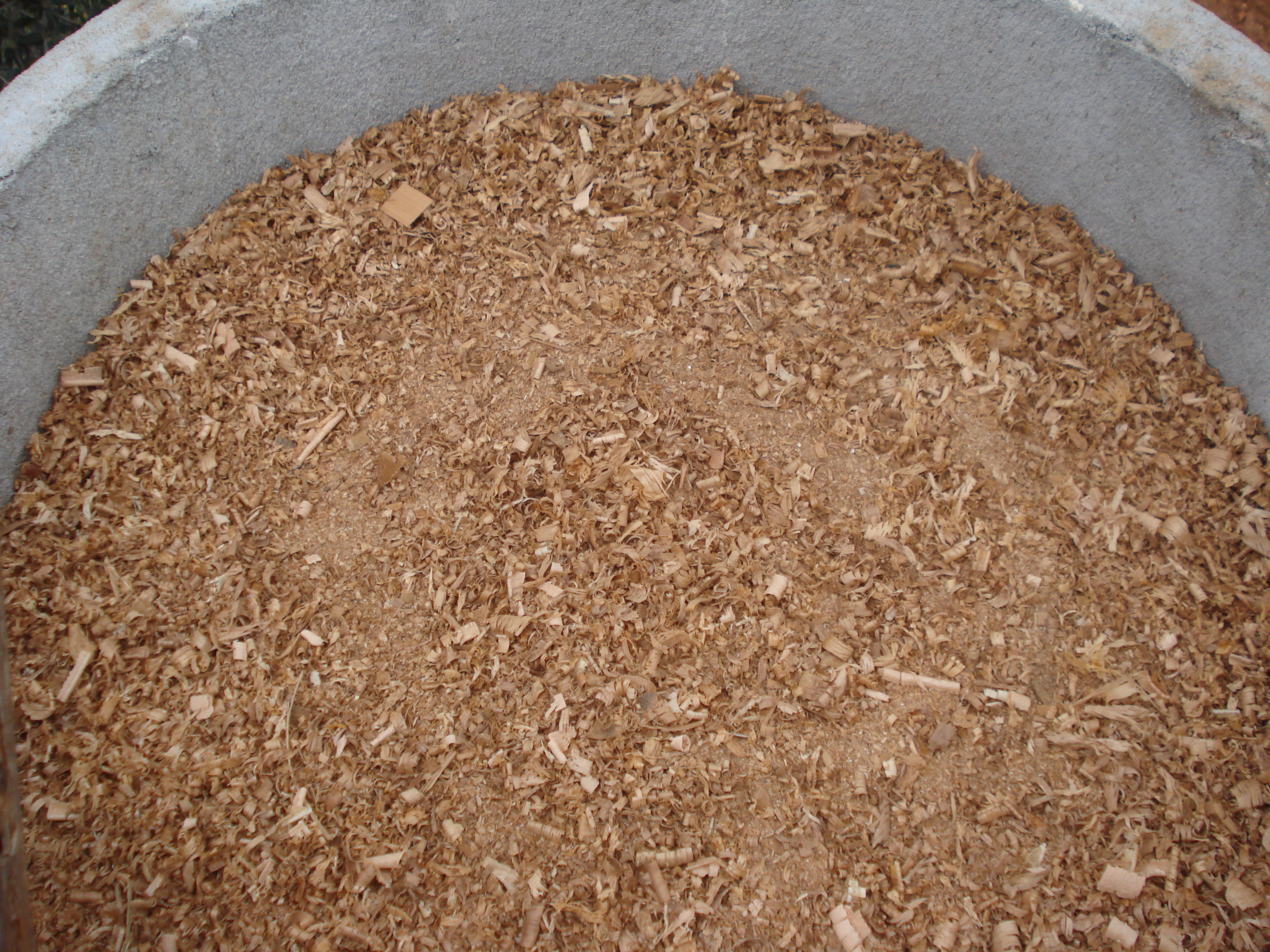
Sawdust is a by-product of lumber production.

A by-product or byproduct is a secondary product derived from a production process, manufacturing process or chemical reaction; it is not the primary product or service being produced.

A by-product can be useful and marketable or it can be considered waste: for example, bran, which is a byproduct of the milling of wheat into refined flour, is sometimes composted or burned for disposal, but in other cases, it can be used as a nutritious ingredient in human food or animal feed. Gasoline was once a byproduct of oil refining that later became a desirable commercial product as motor fuel. The plastic used in plastic shopping bags also started as a by-product of oil refining. By-products are sometimes called co-products to indicate that although they are secondary, they are desired products. For example, hides and leather may be called co-products of beef production. There is no strict distinction between by-products and co-products.

== In economics ==
In the context of production, a by-product is the "output from a joint production process that is minor in quantity and/or net realizable value (NRV) when compared with the main products". Because they are deemed to have no influence on reported financial results, by-products do not receive allocations of joint costs. By-products also, by convention, are not inventoried, but the NRV from by-products is typically recognized as "other income", or as a reduction of joint production processing costs when the by-product is produced.

The International Energy Agency (IEA) defines by-product in the context of life-cycle assessment by defining four different product types: "main products, co-products (which involve similar revenues to the main product), by-products (which result in smaller revenues), and waste products (which provide little or no revenue)."

== In chemistry ==
While some chemists treat "by-product" and "side-product" as synonyms in the above sense of a generic secondary (untargeted) product, others find it useful to distinguish between the two. When the two terms are distinguished, "by-product" is used to refer to a product that is not desired but inevitably results from molecular fragments of starting materials and/or reagents that are not incorporated into the desired product, as a consequence of conservation of mass; in contrast, "side-product" is used to refer to a product that is formed from a competitive process that could, in principle, be suppressed by an optimization of reaction conditions.

== Common byproducts ==
- bagasse and molasses from sugar production
- bran and germ from flour milling
- buttermilk from butter production
- distillers grains from ethanol production
- fly ash and bottom ash from coal combustion
- glycerol from soap or biodiesel production
- lanolin from wool processing
- lees from wine fermentation
- pomace from fruit juice or olive oil production
- saw dust from lumber production
- slag from smelting ore
- straw from grain harvesting
- trub from beer fermentation
- vinasse from sugar or ethanol production
- whey from cheese production

== See also ==
- Main product
- By-product synergy
- Circular economy
- Side reaction
