= Further processing cost =

Further processing cost is the cost incurred to make joint products ready for further use or sale after the production process' split-off point.

== Example ==
Timber sawing produces different joint products as outputs, e.g. grade A and B lumber and scrap wood. Scrap wood can be further processed into wood chips and wood pulp but doing so will let the company incur further costs, i.e. further processing costs.
