= 2018 Cape Fear River coal ash spill =

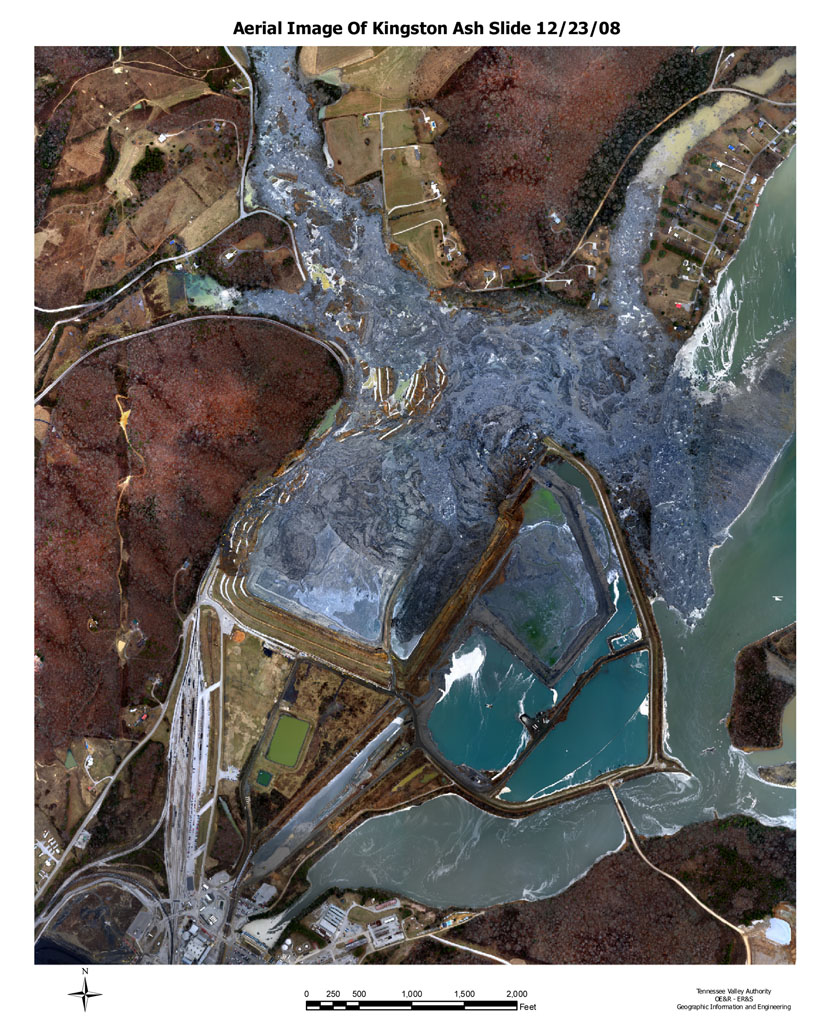
Aerial view of the 2008 Kingston Fossil Plant coal fly ash slurry spill

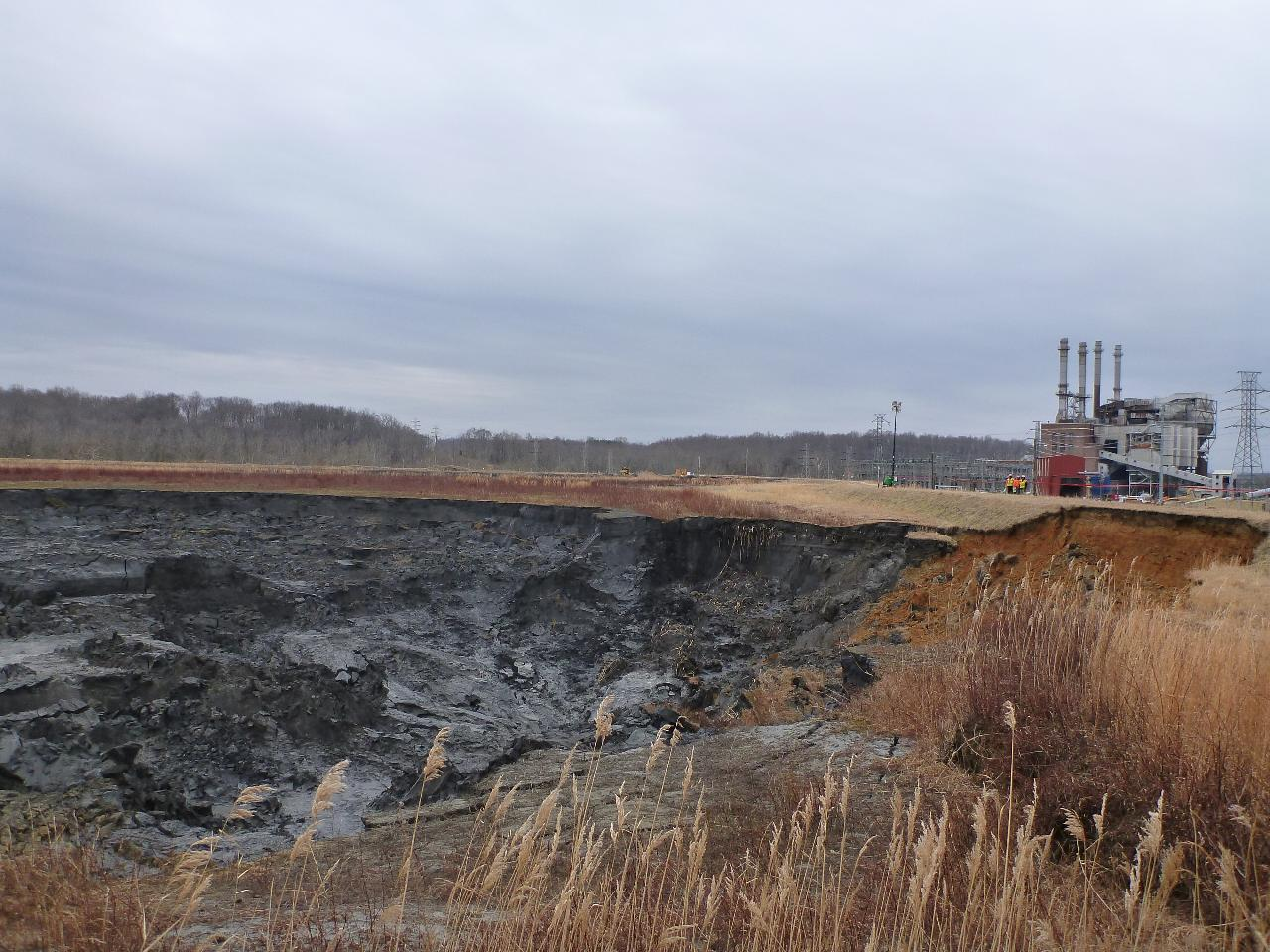
View of collapsed coal ash impoundment at the 2014 Dan River coal ash spill

In September 2018, a dam failure caused by Hurricane Florence led to the leakage of coal ash into the Cape Fear River about five miles northwest of Wilmington, North Carolina. The coal ash came from two storage areas (ash ponds) owned and operated by Duke Energy. Contaminants from the coal ash may have leached into the water source but long term testing has yet to be done by the U.S. Environmental Protection Agency or other environmental agencies. Clean up efforts were led by Duke Energy and mostly consisted of skimming the coal ash off the top of the water.

== Incident ==
On September 14, 2018 Hurricane Florence hit the coast line of North Carolina. While the almost 2 feet (0.61 m) of water that the area received was bad for the dams and catch ponds of the area, the real issues came along when the storm moved inland, dumping more rain water into the Cape Fear River. The flood water produced by the storm damaged the earthen dams built around Sutton Lake, which is used as a reservoir for cooling water. The breach in the earthen dams allowed for water to rush into several coal ash storage areas where roughly 400,000 cubic yards (310,000 m^{3}) of coal ash was stored. Once the water entered the storage areas the coal ash was able to flow out of the storage areas into the Sutton Lake and then into the Cape Fear River.

== Environmental impact ==
There are a few major issues that come along with coal ash spills into large bodies of water. The most visible issue is the turbidity of the coal ash that is dissolved into the water. This is more of a long term issue for the lake than the river because in the lake the ash will be more likely to settle onto the lake bottom, and only run the risk of being stirred up again during the next major storm or other event that will stir up the lake bottom. The river is a high energy environment so it will be less likely to settle on the bottom and the coal ash will thus mostly flow along the river and eventually be deposited in the ocean. The second issue that arises from coal ash being introduced into the Cape Fear River is the high levels of heavy metals that will leach out of the coal ash. Examples of these metals are mercury, lead, selenium, all of which have negative effects on not only human health (when the water is used as drinking water, for example) but also on any wildlife that comes into contact with this contaminated water.

Duke Energy does not argue that coal ash has leaked into the water source but the company does argue whether the drinking water supplied by the Cape Fear has reached unsafe levels of heavy metals. Duke Energy implies that some of the research that is being released by environmental groups is creating uncalled for panic among the citizenry. According to Waterkeeper Alliance, the mercury levels in the present in Sutton Lake are over seventy times greater than safe levels.

== Economic impact ==
The economic impact has yet to be analysed but analysis of similar spills such as the 2014 Dan River coal ash spill shows that even a six month economic impact study is only a short term review of the possible issues. There are multiple costs that need to be considered, Including the ecological and recreational costs that will be add to this event will cripple the areas economy for years to come. Some of the costs may be passed through to Duke Energy customers in the form of higher rates.
