= Health effects of coal ash =

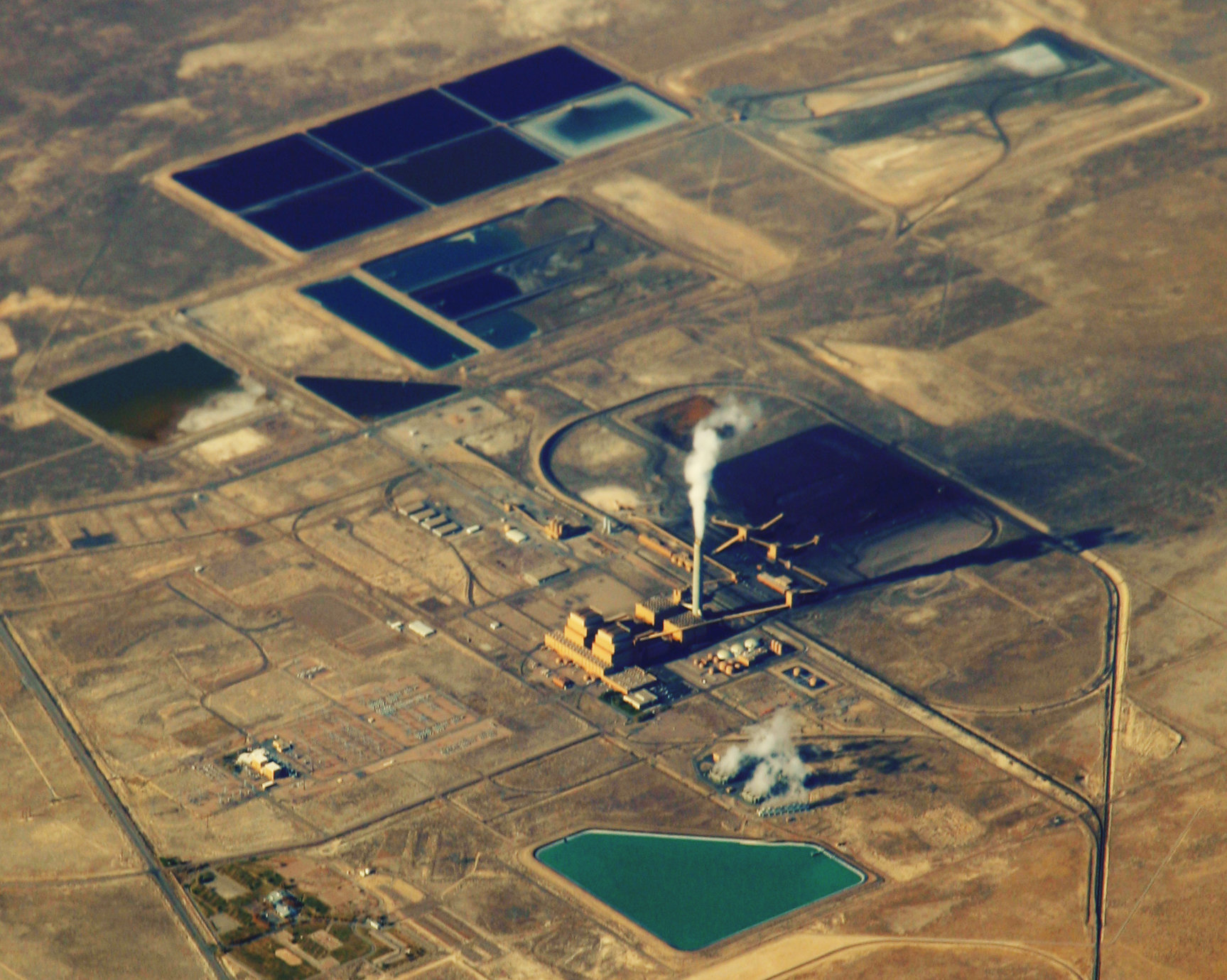
A coal-fired power plant with ash ponds

Coal ash, also known as coal combustion residuals (CCRs), is the mineral residue that remains from burning coal. Exposure to coal ash and to the toxic substances it contains may pose a health risk to workers in coal-fired power plants and residents living near coal ash disposal sites.

== Background ==
Coal ash is produced at coal-fired power plants. Coal is pulverized and then burned to generate electricity. The particles that remain after burning coal are called coal ash, principally consisting of fly ash and bottom ash. Other coal combustion by-products are boiler slag, flue gas desulfurization gypsum, and other kinds of flue gas desulfurization residues. Depending on the type of coal that was burned, the chemical composition found in coal ash can vary. Coal ash obtained from the combustion of bituminous coal is constituted principally of aluminum oxide (Al_{2}O_{3}), calcium oxide (CaO) and silicon dioxide (SiO_{2}). In the composition of coal, there are many potentially hazardous substances that, if found at elevated concentration in inhaled particles, can cause major health problems in humans. Such constituents that are found at various concentrations in coal ash are arsenic, cadmium, chromium, cobalt, copper, lead, lithium, mercury, molybdenum, selenium, thallium and uranium.

Coal ash in India has been stored in ash ponds and has contaminated surrounding land and water bodies. In the United States approximately 110 million tons of coal ash were generated in 2012. More than half of the coal ash produced in the US was dumped into ash ponds (surface impoundments; wet disposal) or landfills (dry disposal). As of 2020 there are 310 active on-site landfills and 735 active on-site surface impoundments in the US.

== Occupational health concerns ==
Coal ash contains many toxic substances that may affect human health, if people are exposed to them above a certain concentration in the form of particulate matter. So it is necessary to avoid situations in which employees working in coal-fired power plants or public members living close to coal ash landfills will be exposed to high coal ash dust concentrations. Coal ash dust health effects can be considered as a particular case of exposure to particulate matter (particle pollution). Accordingly the health risk of the smallest coal ash particles (respirable particles) has to be evaluated, since they can enter into the lungs. In order to evaluate this risk, levels of exposure of workers or members of the public to particulate matter are compared with "safe threshold levels". Regarding the health of workers, the ACGIH publishes annually a booklet with tables presenting threshold level values (TLV's) - maximal concentrations allowed - for a wide range of substances and materials. Particles of coal ash belong to a category called "PNOS - Particles Not Otherwise Specified". For this category, otherwise known as "nuisance dust", the TLV value is 3 mg/m3 for respirable particles (smaller than 10 micrometers).

== Health effects of toxic pollutants ==
Different constituents can be found in coal ash.

Lead: The direct exposure to lead can cause major damage to the nervous system. Lead exposure can lead to kidney disease, hearing impairment, high blood pressure, delays in development, swelling of the brain, hemoglobin damage, and male reproductive problems. Both low levels and high levels of lead exposure can cause harm to the human body.

Cadmium: The direct exposure to high levels of cadmium is hazardous to the health. More specifically, the lungs directly absorb cadmium into the bloodstream. When humans are exposed to cadmium over a long period of time, kidney disease and lung disease can occur. In addition, cadmium exposure can be associated with hypertension. Lastly, chronic exposure of cadmium can cause bone weakness which increases the risk of bone fractures and osteoporosis.

Chromium: The direct exposure to chromium (VI) is hazardous to health. High levels of chromium (VI) in drinking water can cause ulcers in the small intestine and stomach when ingested. Lastly, skin ulcers can also occur when the exposure to chromium (VI) occurs through the skin.

Arsenic: When high amounts of arsenic is inhaled or ingested through coal ash waste, diseases such as bladder cancer, skin cancer, kidney cancer and lung cancer can develop. Ultimately, exposure of arsenic over a long period of time can cause mortality. Furthermore, low levels of arsenic exposure can cause irregular heartbeats, nausea, diarrhea, vomiting, peripheral neuropathy and vision impairment.

Mercury: Chronic exposure of mercury from coal ash can cause harm to the nervous system. When mercury is inhaled or ingested various health effects can occur such as vision impairment, seizures, numbness, memory loss and sleeplessness.

Boron: When coal ash dust is inhaled, the exposure of boron can cause discomfort in the throat, nose and eye. Moreover, when coal ash waste is ingested, boron exposure can be associated with kidney, liver, brain, and intestine impairment.

Molybdenum: When molybdenum is inhaled from coal ash dust, discomfort of the nose, throat, skin and eye can occur. As a result, short-term molybdenum exposure can cause an increase of wheezing and coughing. Furthermore, chronic exposure of molybdenum can cause loss of appetite, tiredness, headaches and muscle soreness.

Thallium: The exposure of thallium in coal ash dust can cause peripheral neuropathy when inhaled. Furthermore, when coal ash is ingested, thallium exposure can cause diarrhea and vomiting. In addition, thallium exposure is also associated with heart, liver, lung and kidney complications.

Silica: When silica is inhaled from coal ash dust, fetal lung disease or silicosis can develop. Furthermore, chronic exposure of silica can cause lung cancer. In addition, exposure to silica over a period of time can cause loss of appetite, poor oxygen circulation, breathing complications and fever.

== Coal ash reuse ==
Reuse of coal ash may benefit the environment by reducing the production of greenhouse gas and reducing the need to use virgin materials. In addition, when coal ash is recycled, costs related to coal ash disposal sites are avoided.

There are two forms of coal ash recycling: “encapsulated” and “unencapsulated." When coal ash is bound to other materials it is encapsulated. For example, coal ash can be reused in making concrete, bricks and wallboards. On the other hand, unencapsulated use of coal ash is when the ash is not bound to other materials (loose particulate or sludge form). An example of unencapsulated coal ash is distributing the ash on icy roads in the winter.

Even though reusing coal ash minimizes health effects in humans, health problems can still occur when coal ash is recycled. Specifically, workers drilling or cutting encapsulated coal ash increase their risk of inhaling coal ash dust. In addition, when unencapsulated coal ash is scattered on snowy streets in the winter, the loose ash can come in contact with ditches on the side of the road. As a result, the toxins from coal ash can leach into surface water bodies as well as groundwater, which may be drinking water sources. Therefore, both forms of recycled coal ash (encapsulated and unencapsulated) can cause serious health issues in humans.

== Coal ash waste regulations ==
In the United States, when coal ash is disposed into surface impoundments and landfills, the ash is regulated as a "Special Waste" (i.e., non-hazardous) under the Resource Conservation and Recovery Act (RCRA).

EPA published a Coal Combustion Residuals (CCR) regulation in 2015. The agency continued to classify coal ash as non-hazardous (thereby avoiding strict permitting requirements under RCRA Subtitle C), but with new restrictions:

1. Existing ash ponds that are contaminating groundwater must stop receiving CCR, and close or retrofit with a liner.
2. Existing ash ponds and landfills must comply with structural and location restrictions, where applicable, or close.
3. A pond no longer receiving CCR is still subject to all regulations unless it is dewatered and covered by 2018.
4. New ponds and landfills must include a geomembrane liner over a layer of compacted soil.

In 2016, the United States Court of Appeals for the District of Columbia Circuit vacated the "early closure" provisions in the regulation at 40 CFR 257.100. EPA then extended the compliance date for inactive ponds that attempted to utilize the early closure provisions. In 2018, at the request of industry, EPA extended the compliance date for unlined ash ponds from 2019 to 2020, and provided more flexibility to state agencies in determining compliance with standards. The 2018 regulation was challenged in litigation and remanded by the court to EPA for further revision. The court ruled that EPA failed to adequately address the problems with unlined ponds, many of which continue to leak into groundwater. In 2019, the court agreed to a voluntary remand while allowing the 2020 compliance deadline for unlined ponds to stay in effect, pending further rulemaking.

EPA published a proposed rule on August 14, 2019 that would use location-based criteria, rather than a numerical threshold (i.e. impoundment or landfill size) that would require an operator to demonstrate minimal environmental impact so that a site could remain in operation.

In response to litigation on the 2015 regulation, EPA published a final RCRA regulation on August 28, 2020 requiring all unlined ash ponds to retrofit with liners or close by April 11, 2021. Some facilities may apply to obtain additional time—up to 2028—to find alternatives for managing ash wastes before closing their surface impoundments.
