= Coal-fired power station =

Type of thermal power station

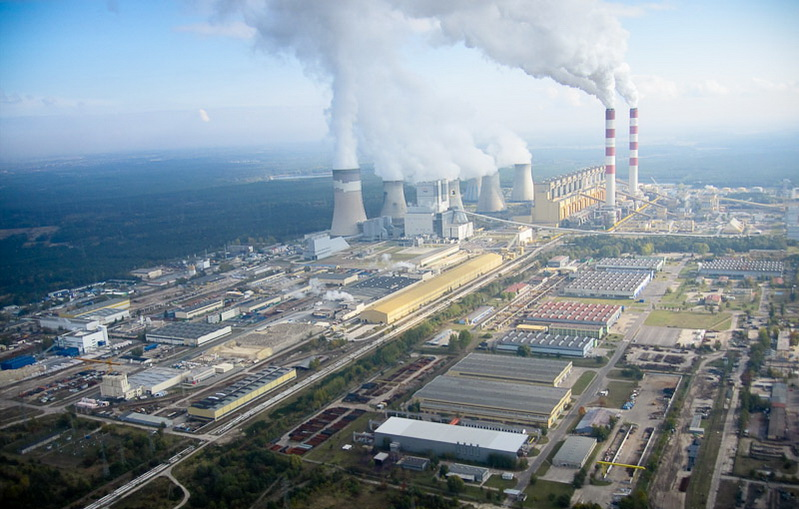
Bełchatów Power Station in Bełchatów, Poland

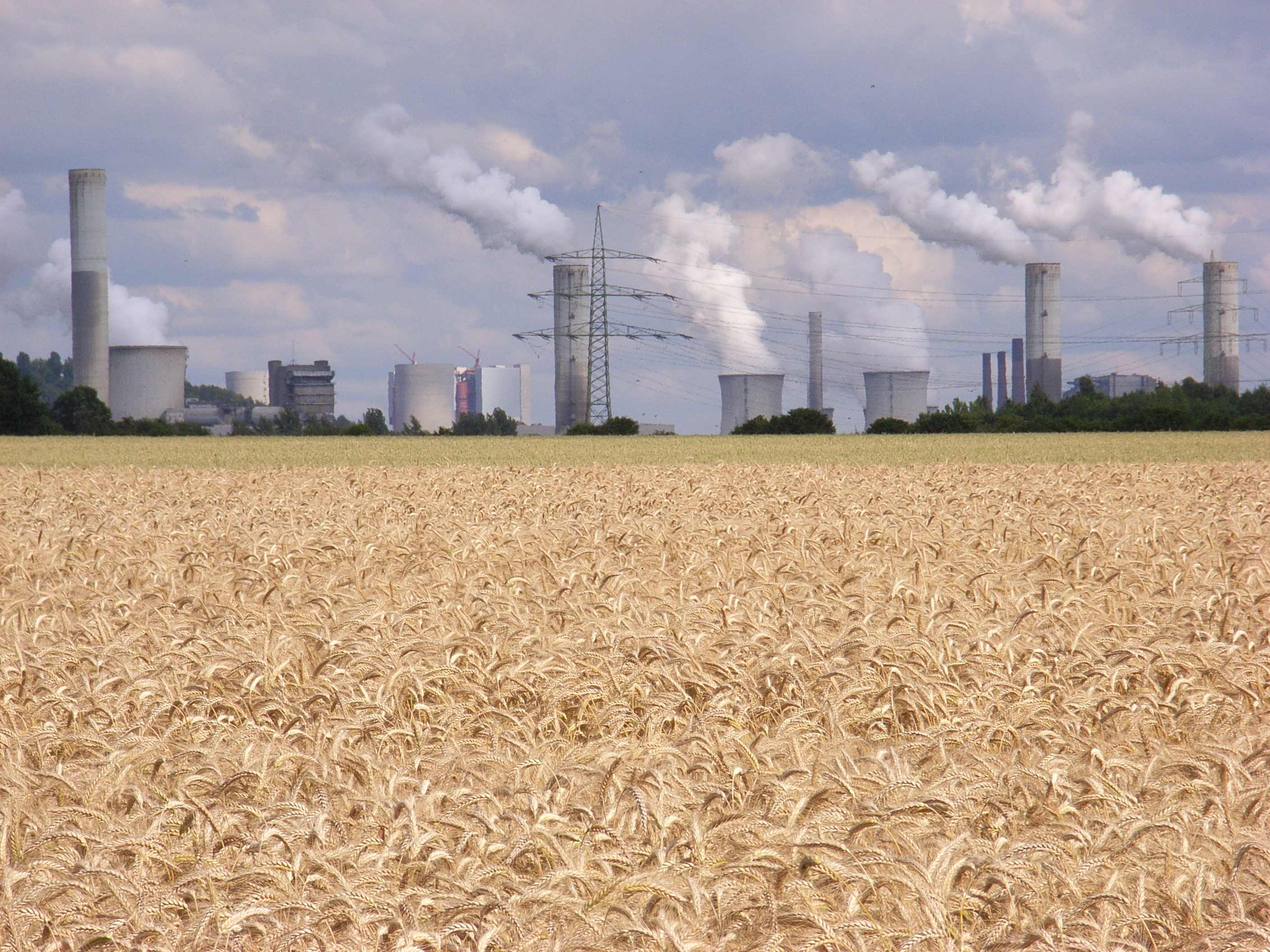
Frimmersdorf Power Station in Grevenbroich, Germany

Coal-fired power station diagram

Share of electricity production from coal

A coal-fired power station or coal power plant is a thermal power station which burns coal to generate electricity. Worldwide there are about 2,500 coal-fired power stations, on average capable of generating a gigawatt each. (Note: The number 7120 in the cite is actually the number of units - as explained by Global Energy Monitor plants may have more than one unit.) They generate about a third of the world's electricity, but cause many illnesses and the most early deaths per unit of energy produced, mainly from air pollution. By far the most coal power capacity is in China, followed by India and the United States.

A coal-fired power station is a type of fossil fuel power station. Coal is delivered by train, truck, barge, ship or slurry pipeline. Some stations are built next to a mine and receive coal by conveyor belt. The coal is usually pulverized and then burned in a pulverized coal-fired boiler. The furnace heat converts boiler water to steam, which is then used to spin turbines that turn generators. Thus chemical energy stored in coal is converted successively into thermal energy, mechanical energy and, finally, electrical energy.

Coal-fired power stations are the largest single contributor to climate change, releasing approximately 12 billion tonnes of carbon dioxide annually, about one-fifth of global greenhouse gas emissions. China accounts for over half of global coal-fired electricity generation. While the total number of operational coal plants began declining in 2020, due to retirements in Europe and the Americas, construction continues in Asia, primarily in China and Southeast Asia. The profitability of some plants is maintained by externalities, as the health and environmental costs of coal production and use are not fully reflected in electricity prices. However, newer plants face the risk of becoming stranded assets. This is a particular risk in Southeast Asia, one of the world regions with the highest growth in coal power plants. The coal trade between miners and consumers averaged about $100 a ton in 2025.

The UN Secretary General has called for OECD nations to phase out coal-fired generation by 2030, and the rest of the world by 2040.

== History ==
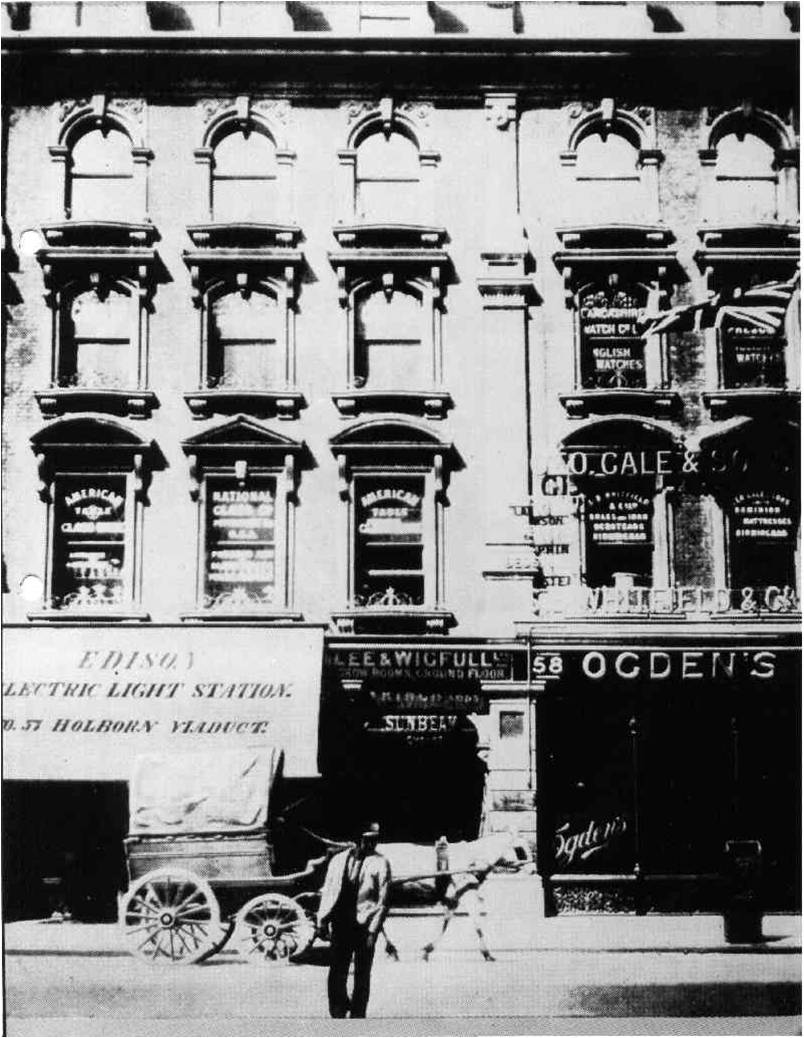
Holborn Viaduct power station in London, the world's first public steam-driven coal power station, opened in 1882

The first coal-fired power stations were built in the late 19th century and used reciprocating engines to generate direct current. Steam turbines allowed much larger plants to be built in the early 20th century and alternating current was used to serve wider areas.

== Transport and delivery of coal ==
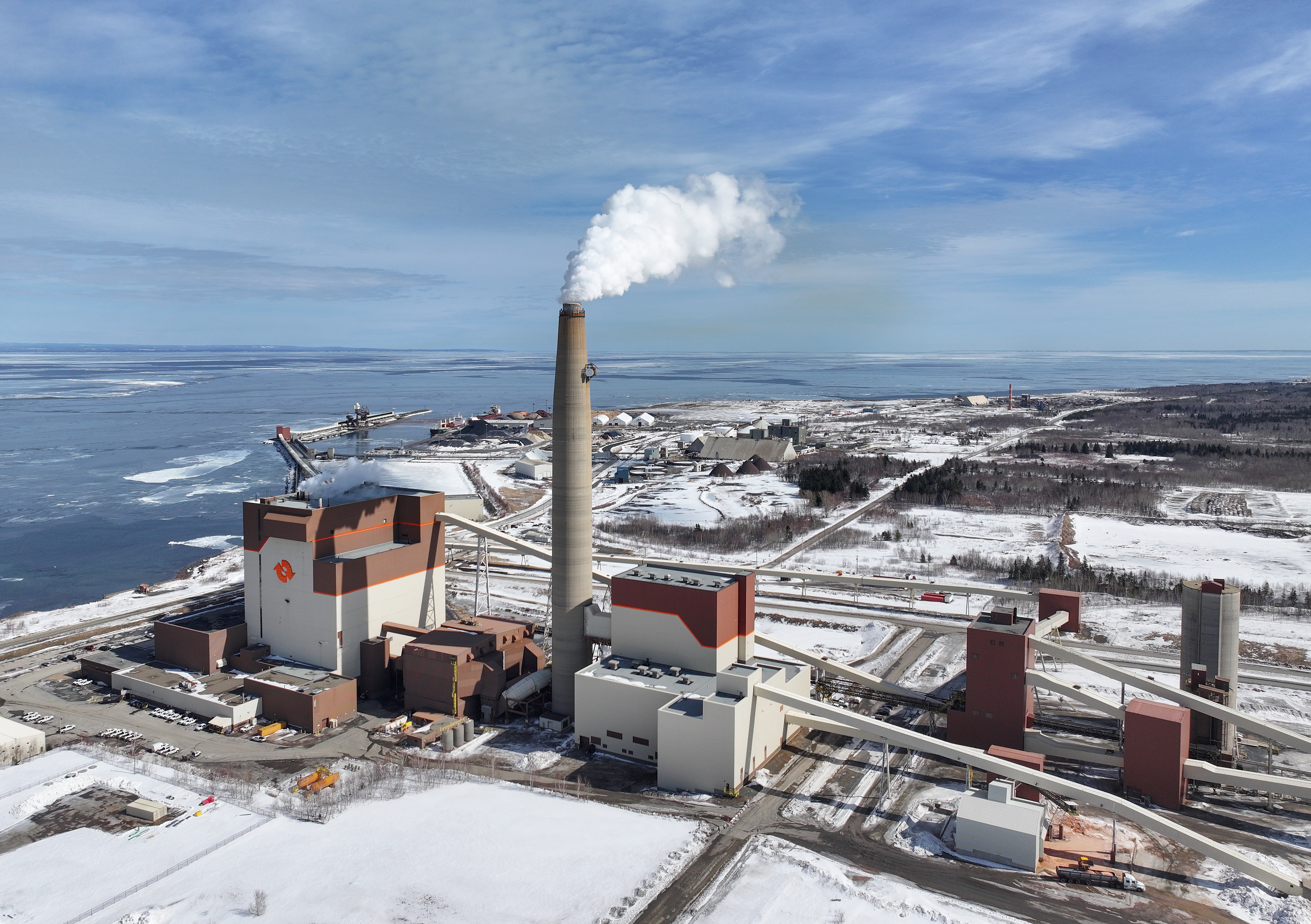
Belledune Generating Station is Canada's largest coal plant

U.S. annual coal production 2007-17 and Weekly spot steam coal prices in 2017

Coal is delivered by highway truck, rail, barge, collier ship or coal slurry pipeline. Generating stations are sometimes built next to a mine; especially one mining coal, such as lignite, which is not valuable enough to transport long-distance; so may receive coal by conveyor belt or massive diesel-electric-drive trucks. A large coal train called a "unit train" may be 2 km long, containing 130–140 cars with around 100 tonnes of coal in each one, for a total load of over 10,000 tonnes. A large plant under full load requires at least one coal delivery this size every day. Plants may get as many as three to five trains a day, especially in "peak season" during the hottest summer or coldest winter months (depending on local climate) when power consumption is high.

Modern unloaders use rotary dump devices, which eliminate problems with coal freezing in bottom dump cars. The unloader includes a train positioner arm that pulls the entire train to position each car over a coal hopper. The dumper clamps an individual car against a platform that swivels the car upside down to dump the coal. Swiveling couplers enable the entire operation to occur while the cars are still coupled together. Unloading a unit train takes about three hours.

Shorter trains may use railcars with an "air-dump", which relies on air pressure from the engine plus a "hot shoe" on each car. This "hot shoe" when it comes into contact with a "hot rail" at the unloading trestle, shoots an electric charge through the air dump apparatus and causes the doors on the bottom of the car to open, dumping the coal through the opening in the trestle. Unloading one of these trains takes anywhere from an hour to an hour and a half. Older unloaders may still use manually operated bottom-dump rail cars and a "shaker" attached to dump the coal.

A collier (cargo ship carrying coal) may hold 41,000 tonnes (40,000 long tons) of coal and takes several days to unload. Some colliers carry their own conveying equipment to unload their own bunkers; others depend on equipment at the plant. For transporting coal in calmer waters, such as rivers and lakes, flat-bottomed barges are often used. Barges are usually unpowered and must be moved by tugboats or towboats.

For start up or auxiliary purposes, the plant may use fuel oil as well. Fuel oil can be delivered to plants by pipeline, tanker, tank car or truck. Oil is stored in vertical cylindrical steel tanks with capacities as high as 14,000 cubic metres (90,000 bbl). The heavier no. 5 "bunker" and no. 6 fuels are typically steam-heated before pumping in cold climates.

== Operation ==
Components of a coal-fired power station

As a type of thermal power station, a coal-fired power station converts chemical energy stored in coal successively into thermal energy, mechanical energy and, finally, electrical energy. The coal is usually pulverized and then burned in a pulverized coal-fired boiler. The heat from the burning pulverized coal converts boiler water to steam, which is then used to spin turbines that turn generators. Compared to a thermal power station burning other fuel types, coal specific fuel processing and ash disposal is required.

For units over about 200 MW capacity, redundancy of key components is provided by installing duplicates of the forced and induced draft fans, air preheaters, and fly ash collectors. On some units of about 60 MW, two boilers per unit may instead be provided. The hundred largest coal power stations range in size from 3,000 MW to 6,700 MW.

=== Boiler operation ===
Plants designed for lignite (brown coal) are used in Indonesia, the Western Balkan countries, and Turkey. Lignite is a much younger form of coal than black coal. It has a lower energy density than black coal and requires a much larger furnace for equivalent heat output. Such coals may contain up to 70% water and ash, yielding lower furnace temperatures and requiring larger induced-draft fans. The firing systems also differ from black coal and typically draw hot gas from the furnace-exit level and mix it with the incoming coal in fan-type mills that inject the pulverized coal and hot gas mixture into the boiler.

=== Ash disposal ===
The ash is often stored in ash ponds. Although the use of ash ponds in combination with air pollution controls (such as wet scrubbers) decreases the amount of airborne pollutants, the structures pose serious health risks for the surrounding environment. Power utility companies have often built the ponds without liners, especially in the United States, and therefore chemicals in the ash can leach into groundwater and surface waters.

Not all substances present in coal will burn; hence, the non-combustible material is present in more concentrated amounts in coal ash than in coal itself. Substances commonly found in coal ash include arsenic, barium, beryllium, boron, cadmium, nickel, lead, mercury, molybdenum, selenium, and thallium. Elevated levels of radioactivity may also be present. Many of these substances, especially heavy metals, can have negative effects on humans when ingested. Because of biomagnification, the concentration of unwanted chemicals in animals can increase up a food chain (similarly to mercury in tuna). Coal ash, a product of combustion, concentrates these elements and can contaminate groundwater or surface waters if there are leaks from an ash pond.

Since the 1990s, power utilities in the U.S. have designed many of their new plants with dry ash handling systems. The dry ash is disposed in landfills, which typically include liners and groundwater monitoring systems. Dry ash may also be recycled into products such as concrete, structural fills for road construction and grout.

==== Fly ash collection ====
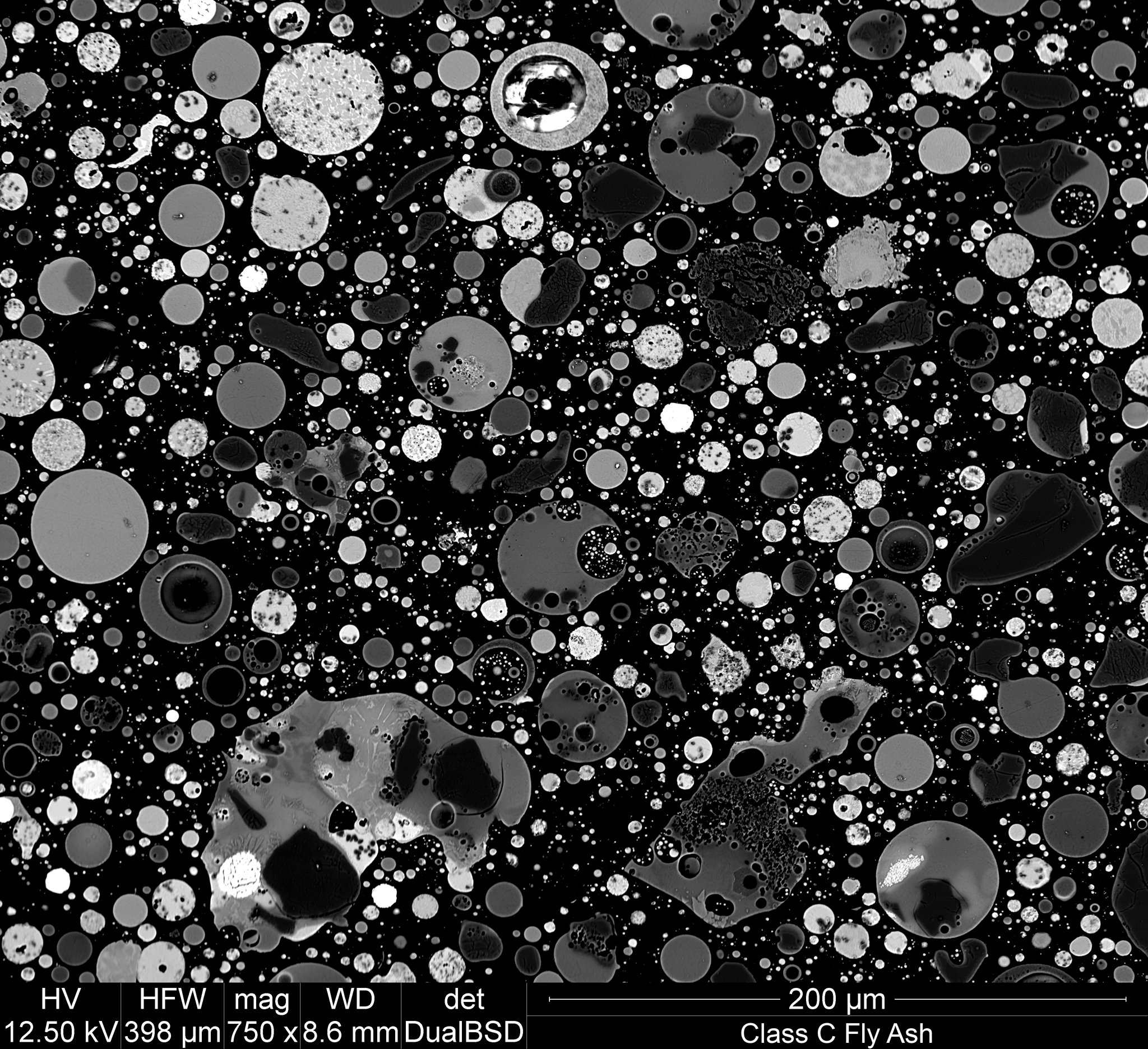
Photomicrograph made with a scanning electron microscope and back-scatter detector: cross section of fly ash particles

Fly ash, flue ash, coal ash, or pulverised fuel ash (in the UK)—plurale tantum: coal combustion residuals (CCRs)—is a coal combustion product that is composed of the particulates that are driven out of coal-fired boilers together with the flue gases. Ash that falls to the bottom of the boiler's combustion chamber (commonly called a firebox) is called bottom ash. In modern coal-fired power plants, fly ash is generally captured by electrostatic precipitators or other particle filtration equipment before the flue gases reach the chimneys. Together with bottom ash removed from the bottom of the boiler, it is known as coal ash.

==== Bottom ash collection and disposal ====
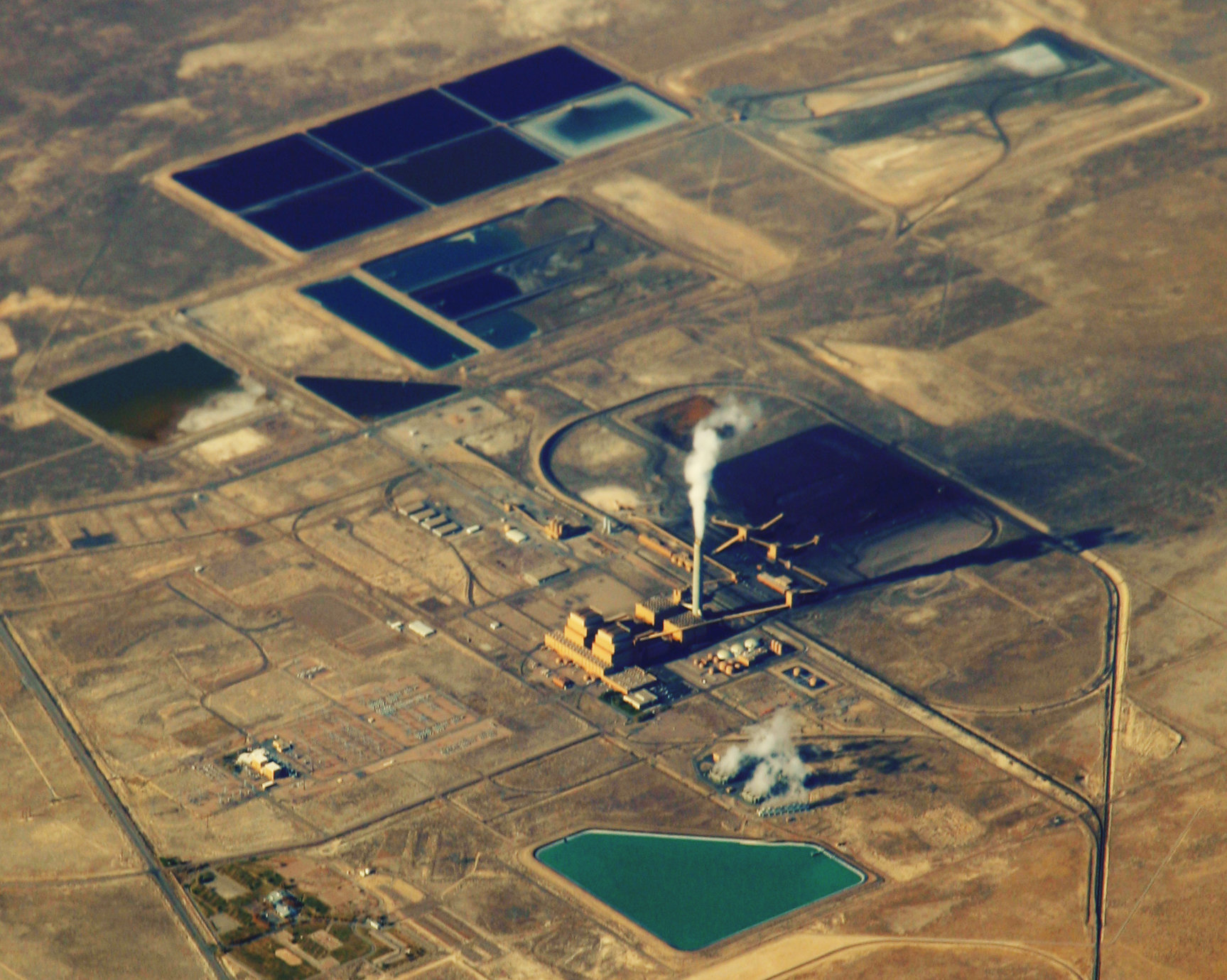
A coal-fired power plant with ash ponds

Bottom ash is part of the non-combustible residue of combustion in a power plant, boiler, furnace, or incinerator. In an industrial context, it has traditionally referred to coal combustion and comprises traces of combustibles embedded in forming clinkers and sticking to hot side walls of a coal-burning furnace during its operation. The portion of the ash that escapes up the chimney or stack is referred to as fly ash. The clinkers fall by themselves into the bottom hopper of a coal-burning furnace and are cooled. The above portion of the ash is also referred to as bottom ash.

=== Flexibility ===
Coal-fired power station animation

Effective energy policy, law and electricity markets are essential for grid flexibility. While the flexibility of some coal-fired power stations can be enhanced, they generally offer less dispatchable generation than most gas-fired power plants. A key aspect of flexibility is low minimum load; however, certain flexibility upgrades for coal plants may be more costly than deploying renewable energy sources with battery storage.

== Coal power generation ==
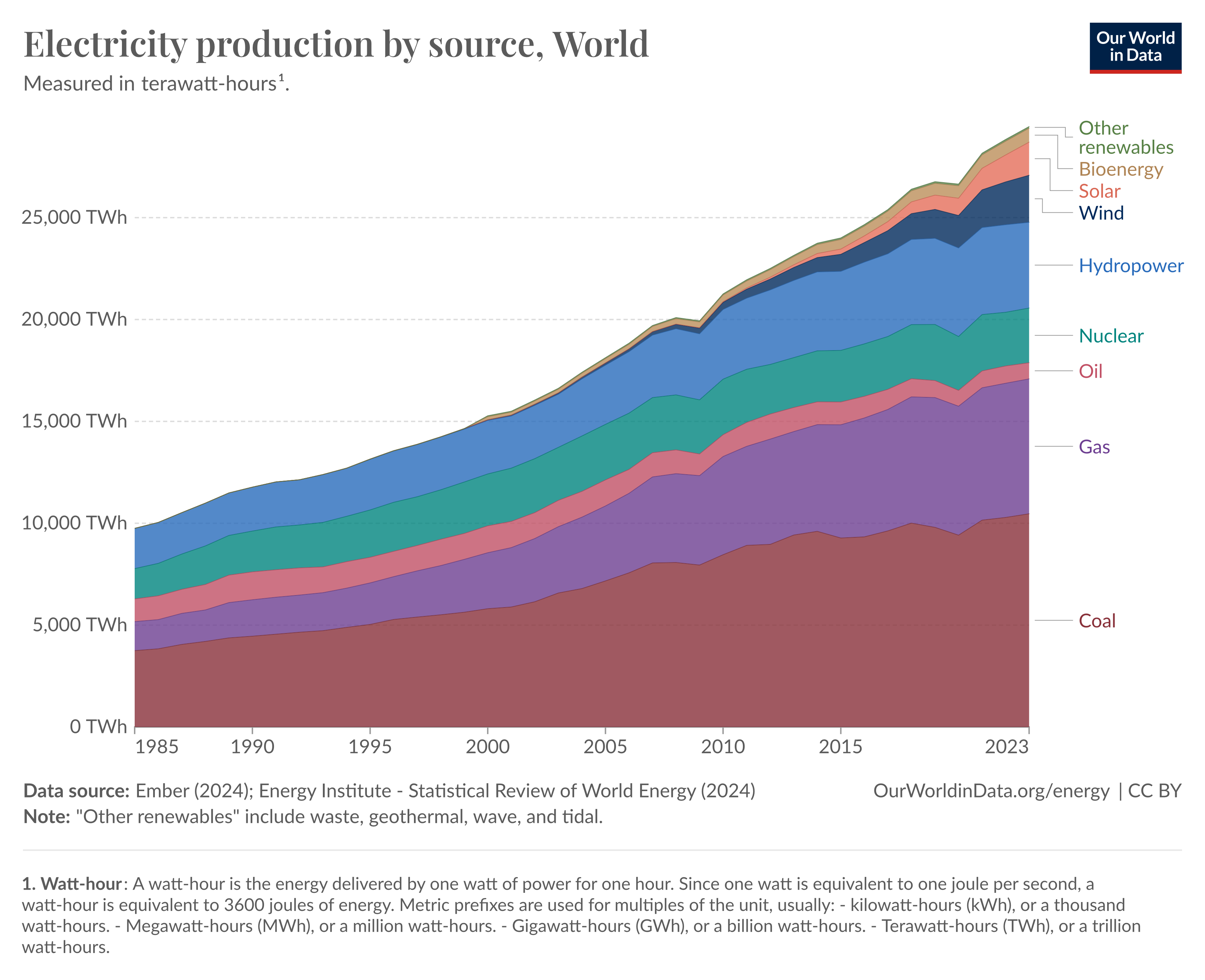
Coal generates over 30% of world electricity

As of 2020 two-thirds of coal burned is to generate electricity. In 2020 coal was the largest source of electricity at 34%. Over half of global coal-fired generation in 2020 occurred in China, and coal provided approximately 60% of electricity in China, India and Indonesia.

Globally in 2020, 2,059 GW of coal-fired capacity was operational, with 50 GW newly commissioned and 25 GW under construction (primarily in China), while 38 GW was retired (mainly in the US and EU).

By 2023, global coal power capacity had increased to 2,130 GW, largely due to 47.4 GW of additions in China.

While some nations pledged to transition away from coal power at the 2021 United Nations Climate Change Conference (COP26) through the Global Coal to Clean Power Transition Statement, significant challenges persist, especially in developing countries such as Indonesia and Vietnam.

== Efficiency ==
There are 3 main types of conventional coal-fired power station. In increasing order of efficiency they are subcritical, supercritical, and ultra-supercritical. Other technologies such as cogeneration plants (also called combined heat and power or CHP) can be even more efficient. Subcritical is the least efficient type; however, recent innovations have allowed retrofits to older subcritical plants to meet or even exceed efficiency of supercritical plants.

Coal plants in the USA have an average efficiency of 32%. German coal power plants have on average 40% efficiency. Ultra-supercritical plants may reach efficiencies up to 49%.

== Integrated gasification combined cycle design ==
Integrated gasification combined cycle (IGCC) is a coal-based power generation technology that uses a high-pressure gasifier to convert coal (or other carbon-based fuels) into pressurized synthesis gas (syngas). The gasification process allows the use of a combined cycle generator, typically achieving higher efficiency. IGCC also facilitates removal of certain pollutants from the syngas before power generation. However, this technology is more expensive than conventional coal-fired power stations.

== Carbon dioxide emissions ==
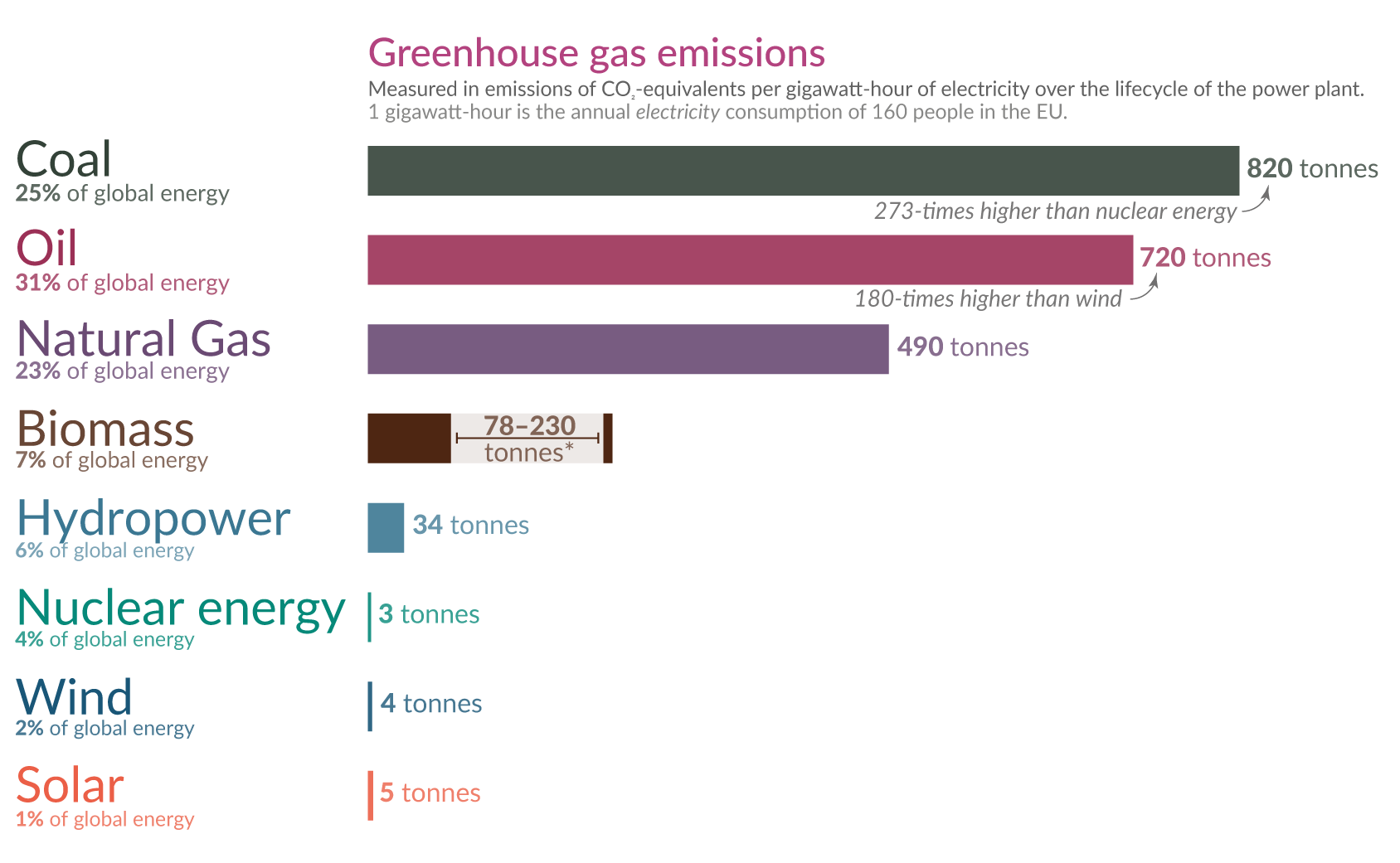
Greenhouse gases by energy source. Coal is the energy source with the most greenhouse gases.

As coal is mainly carbon, coal-fired power stations have a high carbon intensity. On average, coal power stations emit far more greenhouse gas per unit electricity generated compared with other energy sources (see also life-cycle greenhouse-gas emissions of energy sources). In 2018 coal burnt to generate electricity emitted over 10 Gt CO_{2} of the 34 Gt total from fuel combustion (the overall total greenhouse gas emissions for 2018 was 55 Gt CO_{2}e).

=== Mitigation ===
==== Phase out ====
The annual amount of coal plant capacity being retired increased into the mid-2010s. However, the rate of retirement has since stalled, and global coal phase-out is not yet compatible with the goals of the Paris Climate Agreement.

In parallel with retirement of some coal plant capacity, other coal plants are still being added, though the annual amount of added capacity has been declining since the 2010s.

From 2015 to 2020, although coal generation hardly fell in absolute terms, some of its market share was taken by wind and solar. In 2020 only China increased coal power generation, and globally it fell by 4%. However, in 2021, China declared that it limited coal generation until 2025 and subsequently phase it out over time. The UN Secretary General has said that OECD countries should stop generating electricity from coal by 2030 and the rest of the world by 2040, otherwise limiting global warming to 1.5 °C, a target of the Paris Agreement, would be extremely difficult. A 2024 analysis by The Economist concluded that financing phase-out would be cheaper than carbon offsets. However phasing out in Asia can be a financial challenge as plants there are relatively young: in China the co-benefits of closing a plant vary greatly depending on its location. Vietnam is among the few coal-dependent fast developing countries that fully pledged to phase out unbated coal power by the 2040s or as soon as possible thereafter.

==== Ammonia co-firing ====
Ammonia has a high hydrogen density and is easy to handle. It can be used as storing carbon-free fuel in gas turbine power generation and help significantly reduce CO_{2} emissions as a fuel.

In Japan, the first major four-year test project was started in June 2021 to develop technology to enable co-firing a significant amount of ammonia at a large-scale commercial coal-fired plant. However low-carbon hydrogen and ammonia is in demand for sustainable shipping, which unlike electricity generation, has few other clean options.

==== Conversion ====
Some power stations are being converted to burn gas, biomass or waste, and conversion to thermal storage will be trialed in 2023.

==== Carbon capture ====
Retrofitting some existing coal-fired power stations with carbon capture and storage was being considered in China in 2020, but this is very expensive, reduces the energy output and for some plants is not technically feasible.

== Pollution ==
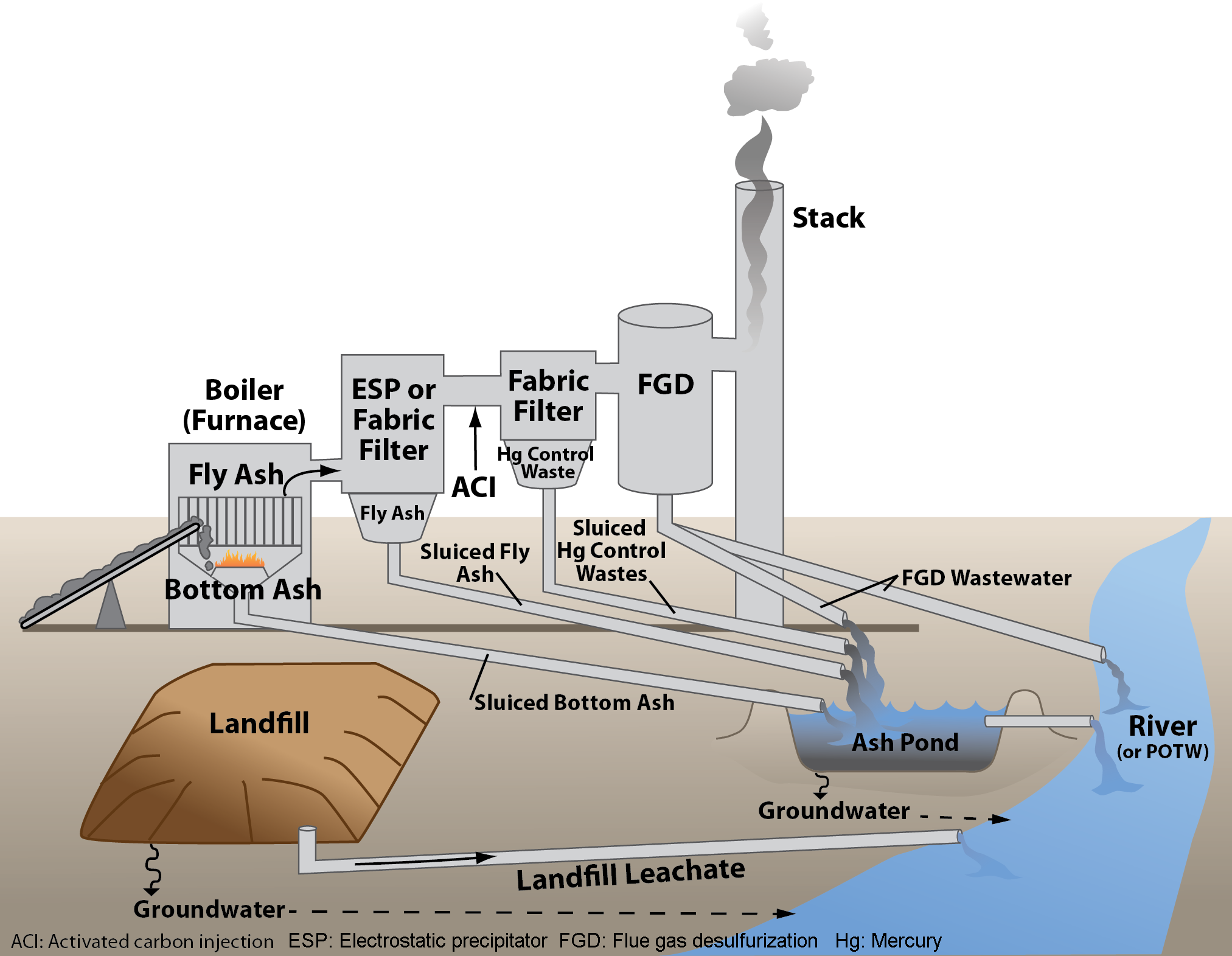
Coal power plant wastestreams

Coal burning power plants kill many thousands of people every year with their emissions of particulates, microscopic air pollutants that enter human lungs and other human organs and induce a variety of adverse medical conditions, including asthma, heart disease, low birth weight and cancers. In the U.S. alone, such particulates, known as PM_{2.5} (particulates with a diameter of 2.5 μm or less), caused at least 460,000 excess deaths over two decades.

In some countries pollution is somewhat controlled by best available techniques, for example those in the EU through its Industrial Emissions Directive. In the United States, coal-fired plants are governed at the national level by several air pollution regulations, including the Mercury and Air Toxics Standards (MATS) regulation, by effluent guidelines for water pollution, and by solid waste regulations under the Resource Conservation and Recovery Act (RCRA).

Coal-fired power stations continue to pollute in lightly regulated countries: such as the Western Balkans, India, Russia and South Africa, causing over a hundred thousand early deaths each year.

=== Local air pollution ===
Damage to health from particulates, sulfur dioxide and nitrogen oxide occurs mainly in Asia and is often due to burning low quality coal, such as lignite, in plants lacking modern flue gas treatment. Early deaths due to air pollution have been estimated at 200 per GW-year, however they may be higher around power plants where scrubbers are not used or lower if they are far from cities. Evidence indicates that exposure to sulfur, sulfates, or PM_{2.5} from coal emissions may be associated with higher relative morbidity or mortality risk than that to other PM_{2.5} constituents or PM_{2.5} from other sources per unit concentration.

=== Water pollution ===
Pollutants such as heavy metals leaching into ground water from unlined coal ash storage ponds or landfills pollute water, possibly for decades or centuries. Pollutant discharges from ash ponds to rivers (or other surface water bodies) typically include arsenic, lead, mercury, selenium, chromium, and cadmium.

Mercury emissions from coal-fired power plants can fall back onto the land and water in rain, and then be converted into methylmercury by bacteria. Through biomagnification, this mercury can then reach dangerously high levels in fish. More than half of atmospheric mercury comes from coal-fired power plants.

Coal-fired power plants also emit sulfur dioxide and nitrogen. These emissions lead to acid rain, which can restructure food webs and lead to the collapse of fish and invertebrate populations.

=== Mitigation of local pollution ===
As of 2018 local pollution in China, which has by far the most coal-fired power stations, is forecast to be reduced further in the 2020s and 2030s, especially if small and low efficiency plants are retired early.

== Economics ==
=== Subsidies ===
Coal power plants tend to serve as base load technology, as they have high availability factors, and are relatively difficult and expensive to ramp up and down. As such, they perform poorly in real-time energy markets, where they are unable to respond to changes in the locational marginal price. In the United States, this has been especially true in light of the advent of cheap natural gas, which can serve as a fuel in dispatchable power plants that substitute the role of baseload on the grid.

In 2020 the coal industry was subsidized $US18 billion.

=== Finance ===
Coal financing is the financial support given to coal mining and coal-fired power stations. Governments and banks in several countries have helped pay for coal power stations abroad. A 2021 study found that China, Japan and the United States all provided overseas coal finance, with Chinese banks, mainly through the Belt and Road Initiative, among the largest backers. Researchers have argued that this financing does not fit the Paris Agreement goal of limiting warming to well below 2 °C, and that a substantial share of the related carbon dioxide emissions would occur after 2019. Falling renewable energy costs may also make some coal projects less profitable.

Some researchers have called for stricter rules on overseas coal finance, including ending public funding and publishing more detail on what is financed. Japan and the United States have been criticised for allowing finance for some coal projects. In 2021 the G7 committed to end support for coal-fired power stations, and China pledged to stop building new coal plants abroad.

=== Capacity factors ===
The capacity factor of a power station is the share of its maximum possible output that it actually produces over a period of time. A station running at full power all year would have a capacity factor of 100%. In 2020, US coal-fired power stations as a whole had a capacity factor of 40%. In India, the capacity factor of coal plants was below 60%.

=== Stranded assets ===
If global warming is limited to well below 2 °C as specified in the Paris Agreement, coal plant stranded assets of over US$500 billion are forecast by 2050, mostly in China. In 2020 think tank Carbon Tracker estimated that 39% of coal-fired plants were already more expensive than new renewables and storage and that 73% would be by 2025. As of 2020 about half of China's coal power companies are losing money and old and small power plants "have no hope of making profits". As of 2021 India is keeping potential stranded assets operating by subsidizing them.

== Politics ==
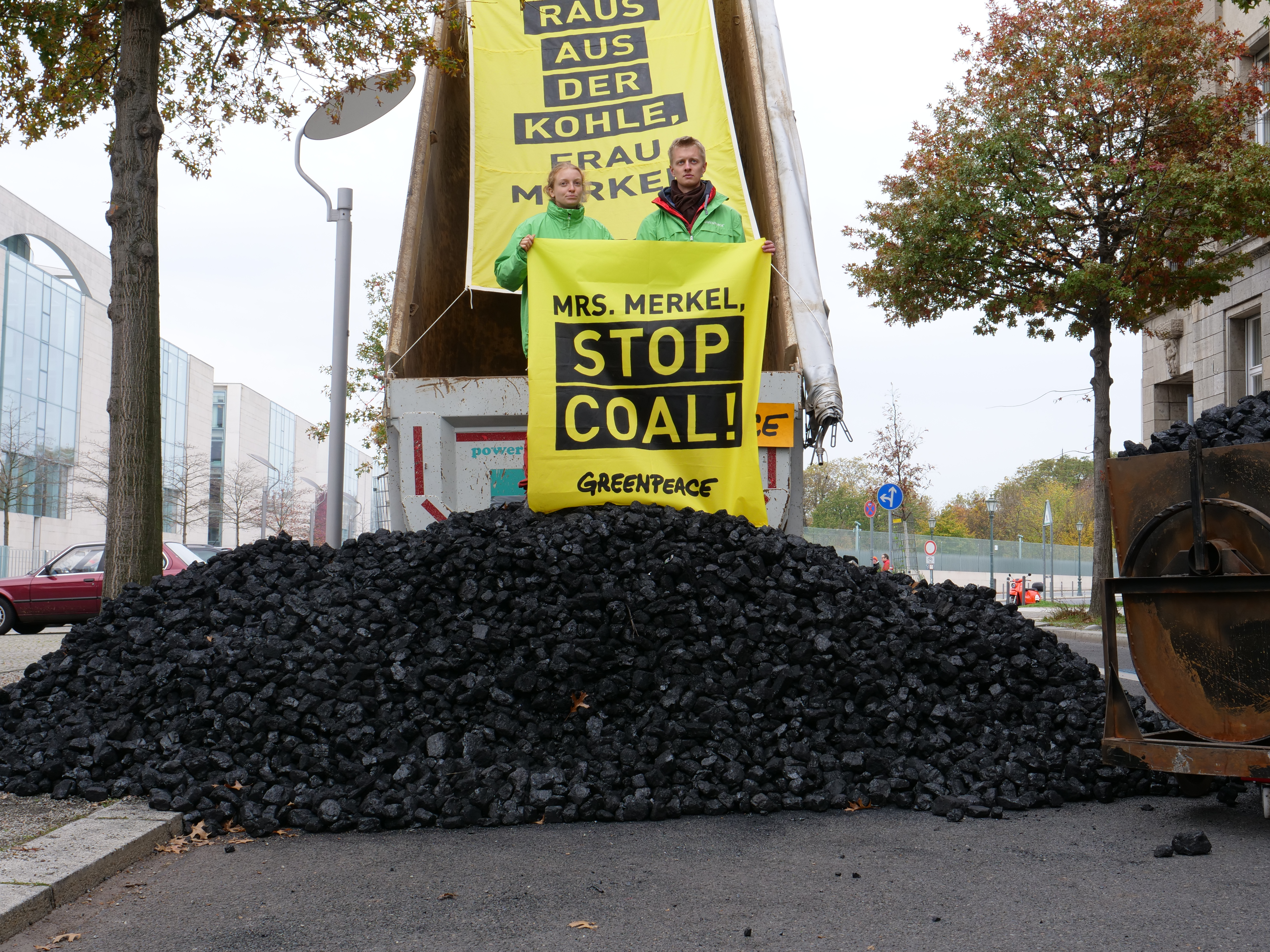
Greenpeace protesting against coal at the German Chancellery

In May 2021, the G7 committed to end support for coal-fired power stations within the year. The G7's commitment to end coal support is significant as their coal capacity decreased from 23% (443 GW) in 2015 to 15% (310 GW) in 2023, reflecting a shift towards greener policies. This contrasts with China and India, where coal remains central to energy policy.

As of 2023, the Group of Twenty (G20) holds 92% of the world's operating coal capacity (1,968 GW) and 88% of pre-construction capacity (336 GW).

The energy policy of China regarding coal and coal in China are the most important factors regarding the future of coal-fired power stations, because the country has so many. According to one analysis local officials overinvested in coal-fired power in the mid-2010s because central government guaranteed operating hours and set a high wholesale electricity price.

In democracies coal power investment follows an environmental Kuznets curve. The energy policy of India about coal is an issue in the politics of India.

=== Protests ===
In the 21st century people have often protested against opencast mining, for example at Hambach Forest, Akbelen Forest and Ffos-y-fran; and at sites of proposed new plants, such as in Kenya and China.

== See also ==
- Powering Past Coal Alliance – Climate change organization
- Global Energy Monitor – American non-governmental organization
