= 2014 Dan River coal ash spill =

Ecological disaster in North Carolina

Coordinates: 36.486°N 79.721°W

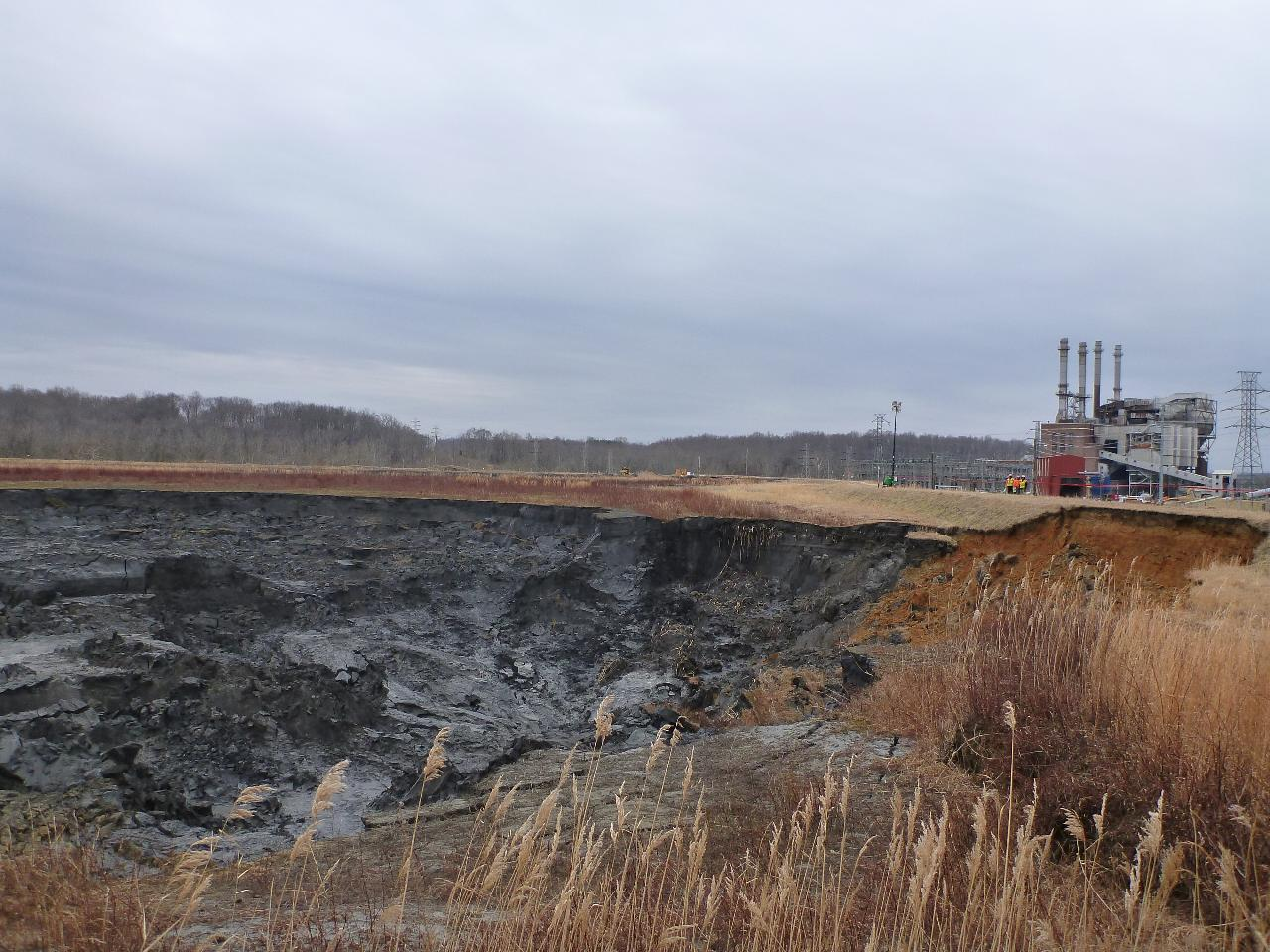
Collapsed coal ash impoundment, with the closed power plant in the background

The 2014 Dan River coal ash spill occurred in February 2014, when an Eden, North Carolina facility owned by Duke Energy spilled 39,000 tons of coal ash into the Dan River. The company later pled guilty to criminal negligence in their handling of coal ash at Eden and elsewhere and paid fines of over $5 million. The United States Environmental Protection Agency (EPA) has since been responsible for overseeing cleanup of the waste. EPA and Duke Energy signed an administrative order for the site cleanup.

== Incident ==
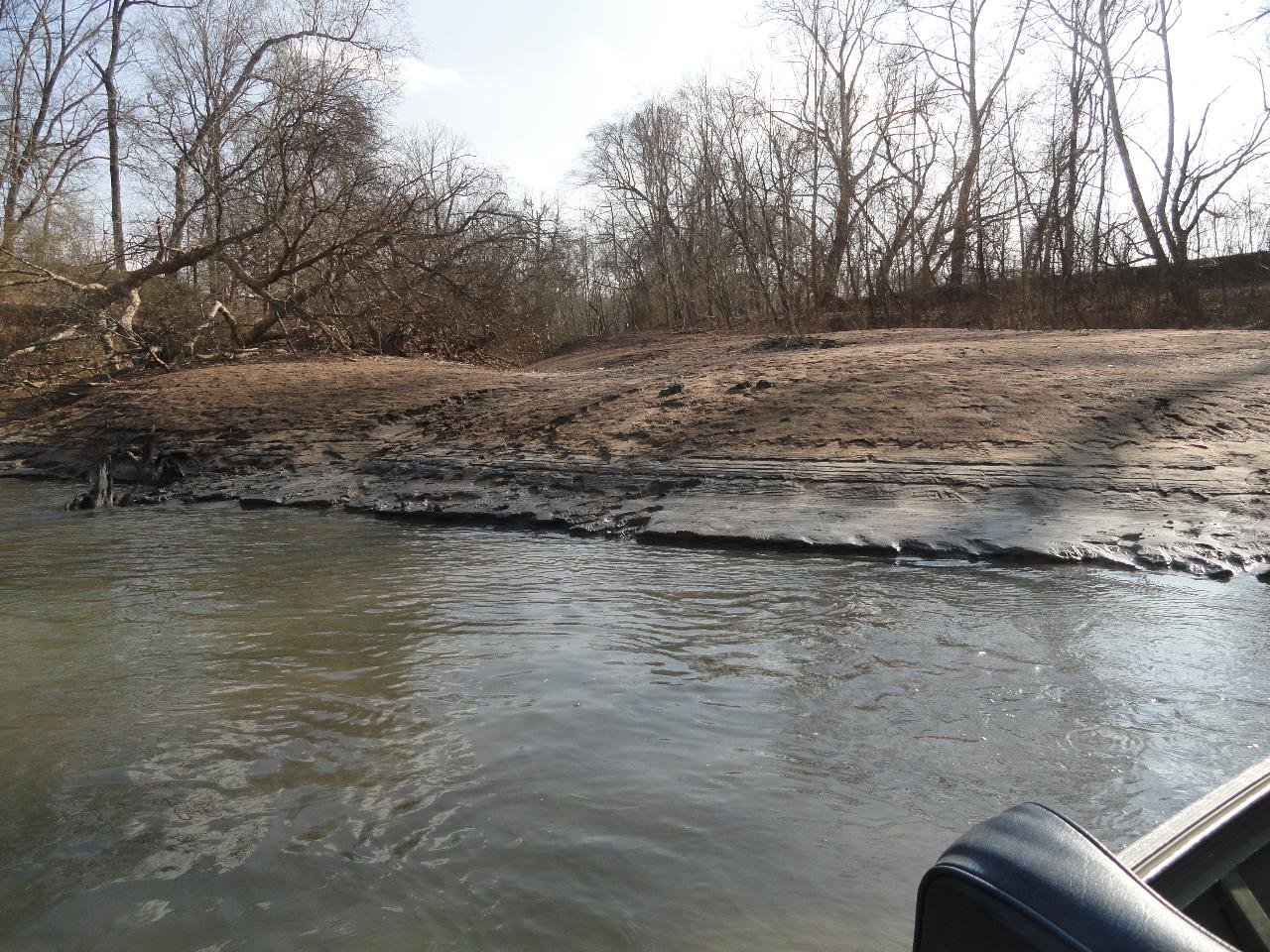
Coal ash deposits on the Dan River shoreline, downstream from the spill

On February 2, 2014 a drainage pipe burst at a coal ash containment pond owned by Duke Energy in Eden, North Carolina, sending 39,000 tons of coal ash into the Dan River. In addition to the coal ash, 27 million gallons of wastewater from the plant was released into the river. The broken pipe was left unsealed for almost a week before the draining coal ash was stopped. The ash was deposited up to 70 miles (110 km) from the site of the spill and contained harmful metals and chemicals. This catastrophe occurred at the site of the Dan River Steam Station, a retired coal power plant which had ceased operation in 2012. Duke Energy apologized for the incident and announced detailed plans for removal of coal ash at the Dan River site. Workers were only able to remove about ten percent of the coal ash that was spilled into the river, but cleanup is ongoing and Duke Energy plans to spend around 3 million dollars to continue the cleanup efforts.

CNN reported that the river was turned into an oily sludge. The river is a drinking water source for communities in North Carolina and Virginia. Immediate tests showed increased amounts of arsenic and selenium, but the river was deemed by state officials to be a safe source for drinking water. However, further tests showed the ash to contain pollutants including but not limited to arsenic, copper, selenium, iron, zinc and lead. The coal ash immediately endangered animals and fish species that lived in or around the river. Six days after the spill Duke Energy announced that the leakage had been stopped and they pledged to clean up the coal ash.

== Reasons for spill ==
The cause of the ash spill was described by EPA as a limited structural flaw. A storm pipe nearby the deposits of a coal ash slurry containment area broke and allowed for the leakage. Coal ash slurry is produced during the process of burning coal. It is the left over impurities that stick around after burning coal for electricity. Coal companies have found that the cheapest way to store this waste is to mix it with water and store it in a pond. These ponds have been found to have leaks that can dispose hazardous material into surface water among other things. EPA has identified at least 25 coal ash ponds in the southeast that are "high hazard". This material was released into the Dan River because of the collapse of a 48 inch drain pipe. The pipe was made of concrete and corrugated metal and reason for the fracture cannot be identified. What resulted was 39 thousand tons of coal ash and 27 million gallons of ash pond water were deposited into the Dan River.

== Environmental impact ==
EPA has been collecting dissolved contaminant concentration data in the Dan River (from the VA/NC state line to midway between Danville and South Boston) since the coal ash spill. The organization has been periodically comparing the retrieved water/sediment chemistry data to ecological risk screening levels (ERSLs) to assess risk to aquatic and plant life. Coal ash is made up of various materials after the burning of coal takes place. These include silica, arsenic, boron, cadmium, chromium, copper, lead, mercury, selenium, and zinc. Certain contaminants that were measured exceed the screening levels, necessitating that the water/sediment chemistry must continue to be monitored. Coal ash can coat and degrade the habitats of aquatic animals as well as cause direct harm to certain organisms.

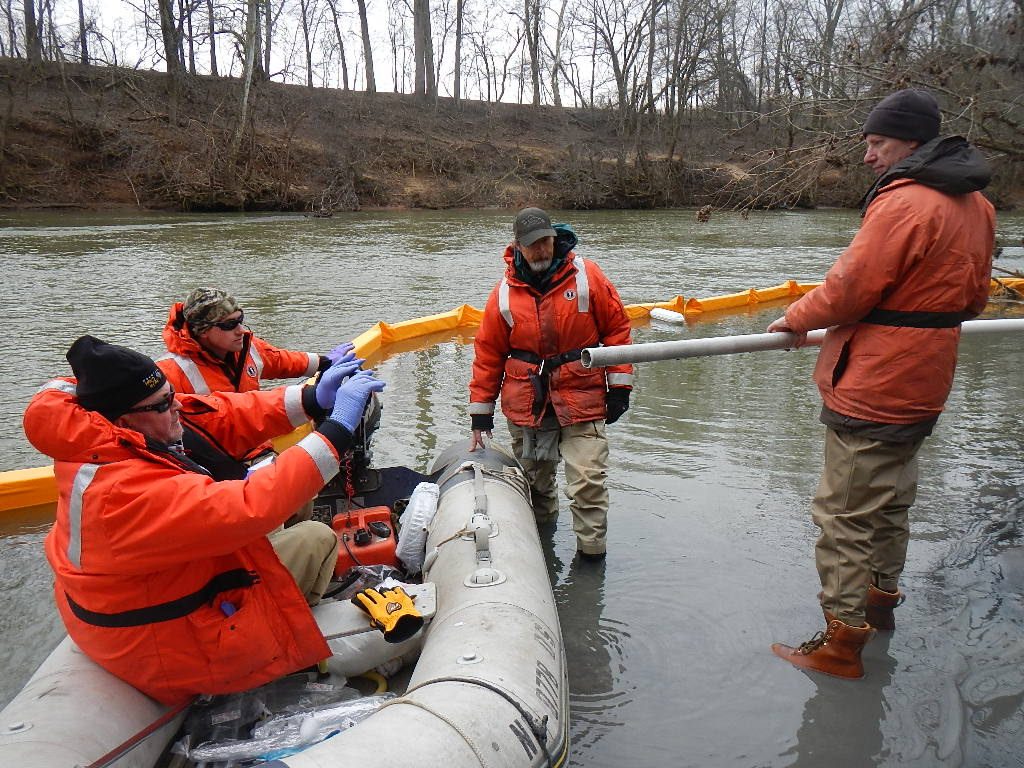
USFWS responders take core samples of Dan River sediment following the spill

The latest surface water sampling results were released by EPA in July 2014. All surface water chemical concentrations were found to be below the ERSLs except for lead. The latest sediment sampling results were also released in July 2014. All sediment chemical concentrations were found to be below the ERSLs except for aluminum, arsenic, barium, and iron. The latest soil sampling results were released in June 2014. All soil chemical concentrations were found to be below the ERSLs except for aluminum, barium, iron, and manganese.

The coal ash will never be fully removed from the river. This is due to samples passing human health screening, the potential for historical contamination to become re-suspended, and removal being more detrimental to certain endangered species than the coal ash itself. In addition, the coal ash is already mixed in with existing sediment, complicating its removal further. EPA estimated that about 72 percent of all the toxic water in the country comes directly from coal-fired power plants.

== Enforcement ==
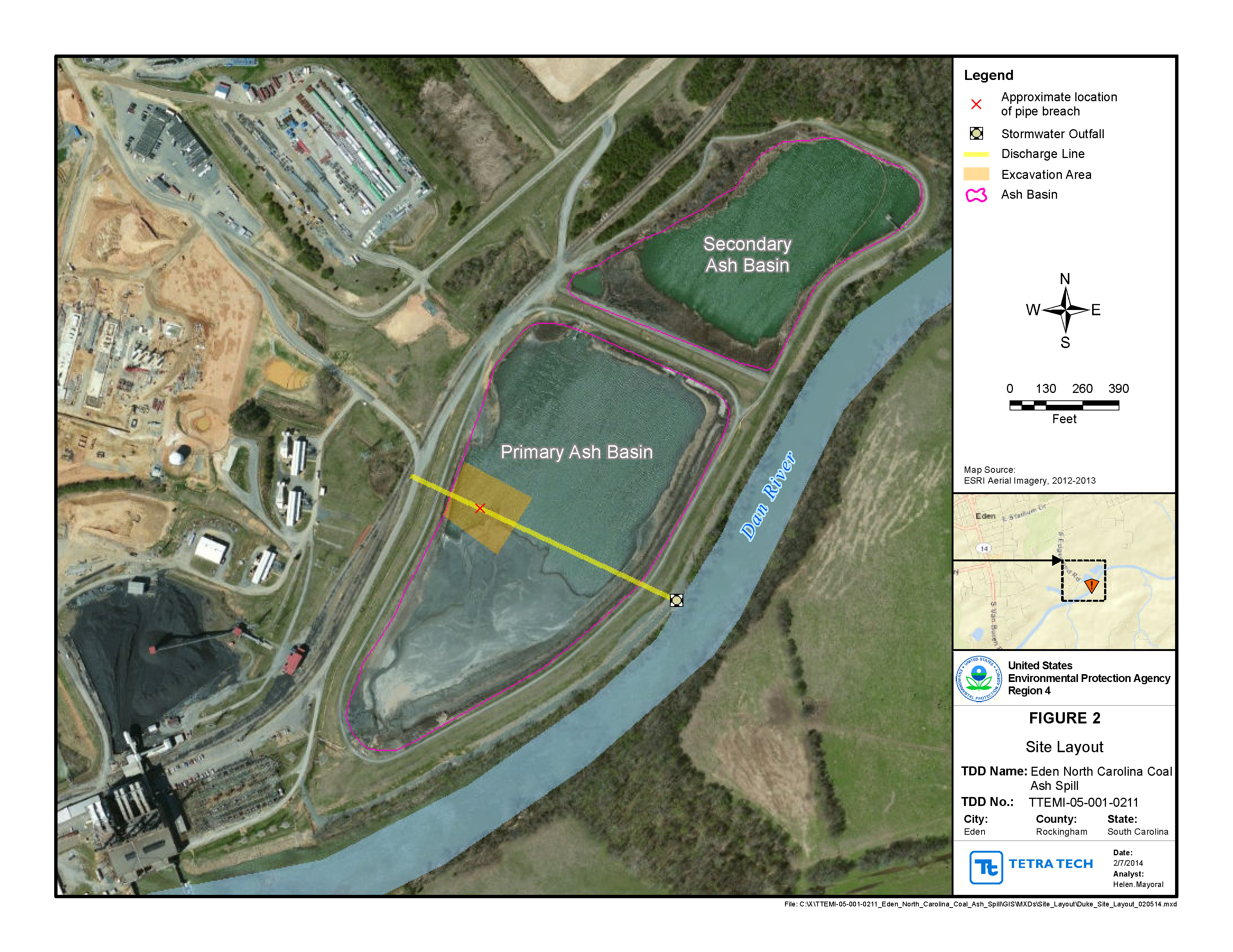
Aerial view of the Dan River Steam Station, site of the 2014 coal ash spill

The New York Times reported that the North Carolina Department of Environmental Quality (NCDEQ; formerly the Department of Environment and Natural Resources) was directed to minimize its regulatory role prior to the accident by Governor Pat McCrory. Prior to being Governor, McCrory had worked for Duke Energy for nearly three decades. At the time, it was the third largest coal ash spill to have occurred in the United States. Prior to the incident, environmental groups had attempted to sue Duke Energy three times in 2013 under the Clean Water Act to force the company to fix leaks in its coal ash dumps. Each time, the groups were blocked by NCDEQ, which eventually fined the company $99,111. Federal prosecutors found this fine to be suspiciously low, and investigated both Duke Energy and the state regulators. Many newspaper editorials alleged that Duke Energy's environmental safety controls were lax and that the company "bullied" regulators.

After the incident, Duke Energy was prosecuted by a number of agencies, and substantial evidence was presented indicating that company officials knew about numerous coal ash leaks in various plants including the Eden facility and declined to resolve it or provide local plant administrators the funds they were requesting to monitor and mitigate the problems. At the federal level, Duke was prosecuted by the United States Department of Justice Environment and Natural Resources Division and pled guilty to nine charges of criminal negligence under the Clean Water Act. Duke agreed to pay $102 million in fines and restitution, the largest federal criminal fine in North Carolina history. Duke also agreed to pay fines to North Carolina and Virginia ($2.5 million).

== Outcomes ==
Largely as a result of the attention brought to Duke Energy's handling of coal ash ponds by the 2014 disaster, the North Carolina state legislature ordered Duke Energy to close its 32 ash ponds in the state by 2029. On May 2, 2014, Duke Energy and EPA agreed to a $3 million dollar cleanup agreement. Part of the agreement is having Duke Energy identify areas of necessary cleanup on the Dan River that is estimated to cost around 1 million dollars. The other 2 million dollars is allocated to EPA to address future response methods needed in order to clean up the Dan River. A spokesperson for Duke Energy announced that the company plans to exit the coal ash business. Associates have said that well before the Dan River incident the company had allocated 130 million dollars to transitioning plants to handle fly ash in dry form and manage it in lined landfills. Duke Energy said that it created an advisory group of researchers to help with cleaner coal combustion at its facilities.

In February 2016, the EPA proposed a $6.8 million settlement, which Duke Energy immediately appealed. In September the corporation accepted a settlement just shy of the original amount at $5,983,750, to be paid for fines, restitution, cleanup assessment, removal, and community action initiatives. Regarding the initial settlement, EPA sends periodic bills to Duke Energy accounting for direct and indirect costs incurred by EPA, its contractors, and the Department of Justice.

The states affected launched a lawsuit on July 18, 2019, asking that the court declare Duke Energy responsible for the damage done to the environment by the spill.

== Cleanup efforts ==
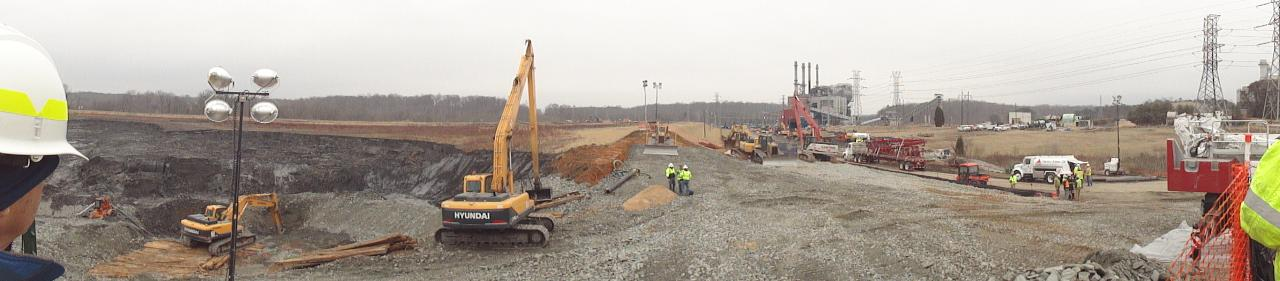
Cleanup activities at the collapsed coal ash impoundment in 2014

To keep the energy provider accountable, under the Administrative Settlement Agreement & Order on Consent for Removal Action (AOC) as of May 2014, the Respondent, Duke Energy, was required to submit a number of plans to EPA, including a scope of work, public health, post-removal site control, and engineering plans.

- The work plan includes descriptions and a schedule of actions required by the settlement.
- The public health plan ensures protection of public health during on-site removal projects.
- The post-removal site control plan provides EPA with documentation of all post-removal arrangements.
- The engineering report describes steps executed by Duke to improve the structural durability of post-release impoundments and storm sewer lines running under their coal ash impoundments.

Within these plans, Duke Energy is responsible for creating and implementing a Site Assessment that includes but is not limited to ecological analysis, surface water and sediment assessment as well as post-removal monitoring protocols to calculate the extent of pollution in the Dan River in North Carolina and the Kerr Reservoir and Schoolfield Dam in Danville, Virginia. These assessments were approved by the EPA in consultation with the affected state agencies including NCDEQ and the Virginia Department of Environmental Quality (VDEQ). Following the spill and written into the AOC are monitoring protocols in which EPA will sporadically authorize the NCDEQ and VDEQ to take split or duplicate water samples to ensure consistent quality after removal of the coal ash.

As of April 1, 2019 North Carolina has ordered Duke Energy to dig up millions of tons of coal ash at six of its power plants. The dangerous coal ash has been mixed with water and stored in uncovered, unlined ponds for decades, but following the 2014 Dan River coal ash spill, many lawsuits have been filed. If the plaintiffs in these cases are successful, Duke Energy would be required to drain all of its 31 ponds. The draining process would cost $5 billion to the already $5.6 billion cleanup from 2014. With the added costs, Duke energy customers could expect to pay a higher fee in the next coming years.

== See also ==
- 2018 Cape Fear River coal ash spill
