= Economies of scope =

Efficiencies formed by variety of products or services offered

Economies of scope are "efficiencies formed by variety, not volume" (the latter concept is "economies of scale"). In the field of economics, "economies" is synonymous with cost savings and "scope" is synonymous with broadening production/services through diversified products. Economies of scope is an economic theory stating that average total cost (ATC) of production decrease as a result of increasing the number of different goods produced. For example, a gas station primarily sells gasoline, but can sell soda, milk, baked goods, etc. and thus achieve economies of scope since with the same facility, each new product attracts new dollars a customer would have spent elsewhere. The business historian Alfred Chandler argued that economies of scope contributed to the rise of American business corporations during the 20th century.

== Economics ==
The term and the development of the concept are attributed to economists John C. Panzar and Robert D. Willig (1977, 1981). Their 1981 article notes that they had coined the term several years previously, and felt that its logic was "intuitively appealing".

Whereas economies of scale for a firm involve reductions in the average cost (cost per unit) arising from increasing the scale of production for a single product type, economies of scope involve lowering average cost by producing more types of products. Hofstrand notes that the two types of economy "are not mutually exclusive".

Economies of scope make product diversification efficient, as part of the Ansoff Matrix, if they are based on the common and recurrent use of proprietary know-how or on an indivisible physical asset. For example, as the number of products promoted is increased, more people can be reached per unit of money spent. At some point, however, additional advertising expenditure on new products may become less effective (an example of the opposite effect, diseconomies of scope). Related examples include distribution of different types of products, product bundling, product lining, and family branding.

Economies of scope exist whenever the total cost of producing two different products or services (X and Y) is lower when a single firm instead of two separate firms produces by themselves.

$$TC(QX + QY) < TC(QX) + TC(QY)$$

The degree of economies of scope (DSC) formula is as follows:

$$DSC={TC(q1)+TC(q2)-TC(q1,q2) \over TC(q1,q2)}$$

If $DSC > 0$, there are economies of scope. It is recommended that two firms cooperate, or systems merge, to produce together.

If $DSC = 0$, there are no economies of scale nor economies of scope.

If $DSC < 0$, there are diseconomies of scope. It is not recommended for the two firms to work together. Diseconomies of scope means that it is more efficient for two firms to work separately since the merged cost per unit is higher than the sum of stand-alone costs.

For a company, if it wants to achieve diversity, the economy of scope is related to resource, and it is similar to resource requirements between enterprises. Relevance supports the economy by improving the applicability of resources in the merged companies and supporting the economical use of resources (such as employees, factories, technical and marketing knowledge) in these companies.

Unlike economies of scale, "which can be reasonably be expected to plateau into an efficient state that will then deliver high-margin revenues for a period", economies of scope may never reach that plateau, or point at all. As Venkatesh Rao of Ribbonfarm explains it, "You may never get to a point where you can claim you have right-sized and right-shaped the business, but you have to keep trying. In fact, managing the ongoing scope-learning process is the essential activity in business strategy. If you ever think you’ve right-sized/right-shaped for the steady state, that’s when you are most vulnerable to attacks."

Research and development (R&D) is a typical example of economies of scope. In R&D economies, unit cost decreases because of the spreading R&D expenses. For example, R&D labs require a minimum number of scientists and researchers whose labour is indivisible. Therefore, when the output of the lab increases, R&D costs per unit may decrease. The substantial indivisible invest in R&D may also implies that average fixed costs will fall rapidly due to the output and sales increase. The ideas from one project can help another project (positive spillovers).

Strategic fit, also known as complementarity that yields economies of scope, is the degree to which, or what kind of activities of different sections of an entrepreneur corporates with each other that complement themselves to achieve competitive advantage. Throughout the strategic fit, diversified firms can merge with interrelated businesses and share the resources. These kind of corporations can limit the duplication of research and developments, provide a more planned and developed selling pipelines for businesses.

=== Joint costs ===
The essential reason for economies of scope is some substantial joint cost across the production of multiple products. The cost of a cable network underlies economies of scope across the provision of broadband service and cable TV. The cost of operating a plane is a joint cost between carrying passengers and carrying freight, and underlies economies of scope across passenger and freight services.

=== Natural monopolies ===
While in the single-output case, economies of scale are a sufficient condition for the verification of a natural monopoly, in the multi-output case, they are not sufficient. Economies of scope are, however, a necessary condition. As a matter of simplification, it is generally accepted that markets may have monopoly features if both economies of scale and economies of scope apply, as well as sunk costs or other barriers to entry.

=== Empirical Evidence ===
In a 2022 article in the Journal of Political Economy, researchers used data from the Indian manufacturing sector to estimate the economies of scope arising from factor-biased productivities that are jointly used across product lines. They found that economies of scope are important determinants of product market entry, and that they change entry probabilities by several percentage points.

== Examples ==
Economies of scope arise when businesses share centralized functions (such as finance or marketing) or when they form interrelationships at other points in the business process (e.g., cross-selling one product alongside another, using the outputs of one business as the inputs of another).

Economies of scope served as the impetus behind the formation of large international conglomerates in the 1970s and 1980s, such as BTR and Hanson in the UK and ITT in the United States. These companies sought to apply their financial skills across a more diverse range of industries through economies of scope. In the 1990s, several conglomerates that "relied on cross-selling, thus reaping economies of scope by using the same people and systems to market many different products"—i.e., "selling the financial products of the one by using the sales teams of the other"—which was the logic behind the 1998 merger of Travelers Group and Citicorp.

The application of information technology to manufacturing has allowed processes to become more flexible and generated more opportunities for economies of scope than were possible with older forms of technology, when equipment tended towards greater specialization in how it could be used. Goldhar and Jelinek argue that the use of computers in manufacturing generates economies of scale via the following capabilities:

- extreme flexibility in product design and product mix
- rapid responses to changes in market demand, product design and mix, output rates, and equipment scheduling
- greater control, accuracy, and repeatability of processes
- reduced costs from less waste and lower training and changeover costs
- more predictability (e.g., maintenance costs)
- faster throughput thanks to better machine use, less in-process inventory, or fewer stoppages for missing or broken parts:
- distributed processing capability made possible and economical by the encoding of process information in easily replicable software
- reduction in risk: a company that sells many product lines, sells in many countries, or both will benefit from reduced risk (e.g., if a product line falls out of fashion or if one country has an economic slowdown, the company will likely be able to continue trading).

Goldhar and Jellinek note that higher machine speeds are now both possible and economically feasible due to the sensory and control capabilities of "smart" machines and the information management capabilities of computer-aided manufacturing (CAM) software.

3D printing is another area which can generate economies of scope, as it is an example of the same equipment producing "multiple products more cheaply in combination than separately".

If a sales team sells several products, it can often do so more efficiently than if it is selling only one product because the cost of travel would be distributed over a greater revenue base, thus improving cost efficiency. There can also be synergies between products such that offering a range of products gives the consumer a more desirable product offering than would a single product. Economies of scope can also operate through distribution efficiencies—i.e. it can be more efficient to ship to any given location a range of products than a single type of product.

Further economies of scope occur when there are cost savings arising from byproducts in the production process, such as when the benefits of heating from energy production has a positive effect on agricultural yields.

== See also ==
- Economic efficiency
- Mass customization
- Theory of the firm
- Economies of scale
- Economies of density
- Joint cost
