= Split-off point =

A split-off point is the point of production at which joint products appear in the production process.

For example, when a company was preparing its financial statements, it realized that because it showed no profit or loss, it was unattractive to investors. The company got the idea to form two subsidiaries so that one is making huge profits and the other is making huge losses, which can be easily measurable and it can decide the future of the companies and where developments are required.

== See also ==
- Joint cost
