= Ash pond =

Coal plant disposal structure

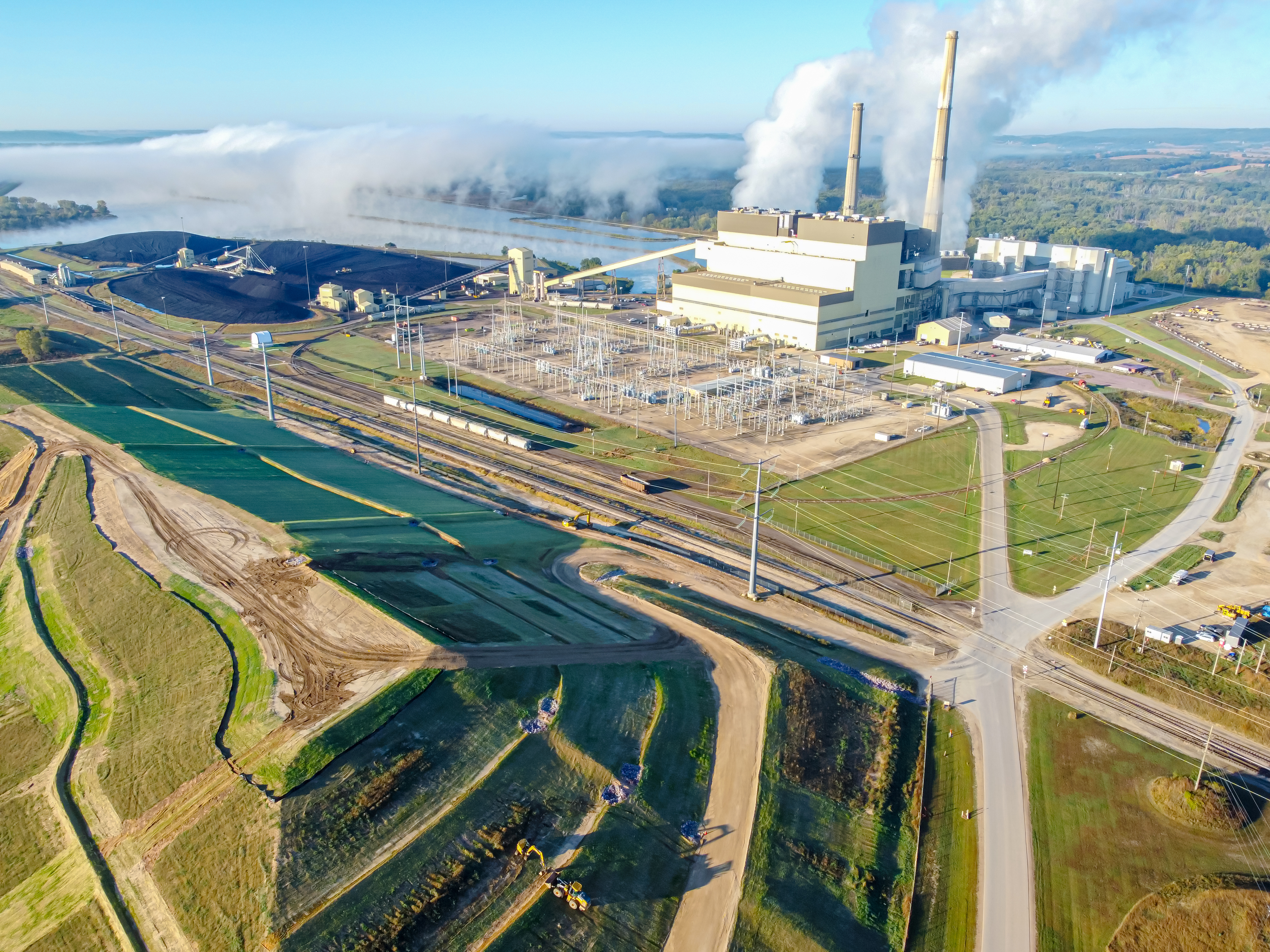
Columbia Energy Center in Wisconsin with a coal ash pond landfill

An ash pond, also called a coal-ash basin or surface impoundment, is an engineered structure used at coal-fired power stations for the disposal of two types of coal combustion products: bottom ash and fly ash. The pond is used as a landfill to prevent the release of ash into the atmosphere and surface water. Although the use of ash ponds in combination with air-pollution controls (such as wet scrubbers) decreases the amount of airborne pollutants, the structures pose serious health risks for the surrounding environment.

Ash ponds use gravity to settle out large particulates (measured as total suspended solids) from power-plant wastewater. This technology does not treat dissolved pollutants. The ponds generally have not been built as lined landfills; therefore, chemicals in the ash can leach into groundwater and surface waters, accumulating in the biomass of the system.

== Design ==
Ash ponds are generally formed using a ring embankment to enclose the disposal site. The embankments are designed using similar design parameters as embankment dams, including zoned construction with clay cores. The design process is primarily focused on handling seepage and ensuring slope stability.

Failure of a pond's earthen embankment can cause ash spills on adjacent land and rivers, with serious environmental damage, as evidenced in the 2008 Kingston Fossil Plant spill in Tennessee and the 2014 Dan River coal ash spill in North Carolina.

== Disposal methods ==
The wet disposal of ash into ash ponds is the most common ash disposal method, but other methods include dry disposal in landfills. Dry-handled ash is often recycled into useful building materials. Wet disposal has been preferred for economic reasons, but increasing environmental concerns regarding leachate from ponds has decreased the popularity of wet disposal. The wet method consists of constructing a large "pond" and filling it with fly-ash slurry, allowing the water to drain and evaporate from the fly ash over time.

The flow of water through the fly ash and into ground water is controlled by using low-permeability clay layers and cutoff trenches/walls. Low-permeability clays have permeabilities on the order of 10^{−7} cm/s. Vertical flows through the foundation are controlled by siting fly ash ponds on areas of thick clay or rock layers that provide suitably low permeability through the base of the pond. Areas with high sub-surface permeability can be improved by importing suitable clay. Horizontal flows through the embankment are controlled using clay zones within the embankment. Cutoff trenches and cutoff walls are used to connect the embankment clay zones and the foundation clay layers. Cutoff trenches are trenches that are dug into the selected low-permeability sub-surface layer and backfilled with clay to key the embankment clay zone into the sub-surface. Cutoff trenches are generally used when the low-permeability foundation layers are near surface. Cutoff walls are similar to cutoff trenches, but are generally much deeper and narrower, and use either slurry or grout instead of clay.

== Health and environmental impacts ==
Not all substances present in coal will burn; hence, the non-combustible material is present in more concentrated amounts in coal ash than in coal itself. Substances commonly found in coal ash include arsenic, barium, beryllium, boron, cadmium, nickel, lead, mercury, molybdenum, selenium, and thallium. Elevated levels of radioactivity may also be present. Many of these substances, especially heavy metals, can have negative effects on humans when ingested. Because of biomagnification, the concentration of unwanted chemicals in animals can increase up a food chain (similarly to mercury in tuna). Coal ash, a product of combustion, concentrates these elements and can contaminate groundwater or surface waters if there are leaks from an ash pond.

== Countries ==
=== Australia ===
Coal ash accounts for almost one-fifth of the waste generated in Australia. There are no national regulations requiring recycling of coal ash. About 47% of coal ash was recycled in 2020. Coal ash in New South Wales is typically stored in landfills ("dry emplacements") or ash ponds ("ash dams"). Coal ash storage is regulated by the state Environment Protection Authority and its Dams Safety Committee, which publishes standards for dam design and environmental monitoring.

=== Netherlands ===
Ash ponds are not allowed in the Netherlands, as they are a type of landfill. Instead, all coal ash is recycled in the Netherlands.

=== Turkey ===
In 2021, inspections were criticized and said to be insufficient.

=== United States ===
In the United States, coal ash is a major component of the nation's industrial waste stream. As of 2012, there were over 470 operational coal-fired power plants in the US, and approximately 60% of US coal ash was disposed in surface impoundments and landfills. The US had 310 active on-site landfills in 2012, averaging more than 120 acres (49 ha) in size with an average depth of over 40 feet (12 m), and more than 735 active on-site surface impoundments, averaging more than 50 acres (20 ha) in size with an average depth of 20 feet (6.1 m). In 2017, 38.2 million short tons (34.7×10^{6} t) of fly ash and 9.7 million short tons (8.8×10^{6} t) of bottom ash were generated. As of July 2023, 210 coal-fired power plants were operational in the United States.

In 2018, an environmental justice advisor to the US Environmental Protection Agency (EPA) stated that the increased toxic exposures from ash ponds will have disproportionate adverse health effects on low-income and minority communities.

A 2019 report by the Environmental Integrity Project stated that, for US coal-fired plants with available monitoring data, 91% of them have contaminated groundwater with "unsafe levels of toxic pollutants."

Historically, due to few federal and state regulations concerning ash ponds, most US power plants do not use geomembranes, leachate collection systems, or other flow controls often found in municipal solid waste landfills. In 1980 the US Congress defined coal ash as a "special waste" that would not be regulated under the stringent hazardous waste permitting requirements of the Resource Conservation and Recovery Act (RCRA). Congress also directed EPA to study the coal-ash problem and decide whether further regulation would be appropriate. Pursuant to the Congressional directive, EPA reported in 2000 that coal fly ash did not need to be regulated as a hazardous waste.

Following a 2008 failure that caused the Tennessee Valley Authority's Kingston Fossil Plant coal fly ash slurry spill, the EPA began developing regulations that would apply to all ash ponds in the US. The EPA published a Coal Combustion Residuals (CCR) regulation in 2015. The agency continued to classify coal ash as non-hazardous (thereby avoiding strict permitting requirements under RCRA Subtitle C), but with new restrictions:

1. Existing ash ponds that are contaminating groundwater must stop receiving CCR, and close or retrofit with a liner.
2. Existing ash ponds and landfills must comply with structural and location restrictions, where applicable, or close.
3. A pond no longer receiving CCR is still subject to all regulations unless it is dewatered and covered by 2018.
4. New ponds and landfills must include a geomembrane liner over a layer of compacted soil.

Some of the provisions in the 2015 CCR regulation were challenged in litigation, and the United States Court of Appeals for the District of Columbia Circuit remanded certain portions of the regulation to EPA for further rulemaking.

EPA also published an effluent guidelines (wastewater) regulation in 2015 pursuant to the Clean Water Act. The regulation limits discharges of toxic metals from power plants, including ash ponds and other waste streams. The Agency estimated that the regulation would reduce the industry's metals discharges of 1.4 billion pounds (640×10^{6} kg) annually. In 2020, the EPA published a final rule that reversed some provisions of the 2015 wastewater regulation. The revised regulation extended the compliance deadline for some power plants, and exempted some others completely from the more stringent 2015 requirements. In May 2024, the EPA published a final rule that reverses some aspects of the 2020 rule and tightens the wastewater limitations for some facilities.

Following a court remand, the EPA published its "CCR Part A" final rule on August 28, 2020, requiring all unlined ash ponds to retrofit with liners or close by April 11, 2021. Some facilities were allowed to apply to obtain additional time—up to 2028—to find alternatives for managing ash wastes before closing their surface impoundments. The EPA published its "CCR Part B" rule on November 12, 2020, which would allow certain facilities to use an alternative liner, based on a demonstration that human health and the environment will not be affected. Several facilities have applied for alternate liner demonstrations, but as of early 2026 EPA has not made final determinations on the applications.

On January 11, 2022, the EPA announced an enforcement action involving ash ponds at certain coal-fired plants in Indiana, Ohio, Iowa, and New York. The agency's proposal would deny the plants' requests for extensions beyond the 2021 deadline and would require them to close their ash ponds ahead of their proposed schedules. The EPA sent warning letters to four additional plants. The EPA received a total of 57 extension requests. In November 2022, the agency announced its initial final determination on an extension request, denying a request submitted by a plant in Ohio. As of 2024, the EPA has published proposed determinations for additional plants and the review process is ongoing. Each proposed determination is subject to a public comment period.

In response to litigation, the EPA published a final RCRA rule in May 2024 setting regulatory requirements for active and inactive CCR facilities, including groundwater monitoring, corrective action, closure, and post-closure care requirements.

== Remediation ==
Remediation options include "capping, dewatering and/or stabilizing, consolidating into a new landfill, disposing off site, converting to wetlands, or any combination of these options."

There are some initiatives, such as a 2015 initiative by Duke Energy, to excavate existing ash ponds to reduce the environmental effects of coal-burning power facilities on the surrounding environment.

== See also ==
- Brownfield land
- Health effects of coal ash
- Industrial wastewater treatment
- Tailings dam
