= Bottom ash =

Solid residue of combustion in the lower part of an industrial oven

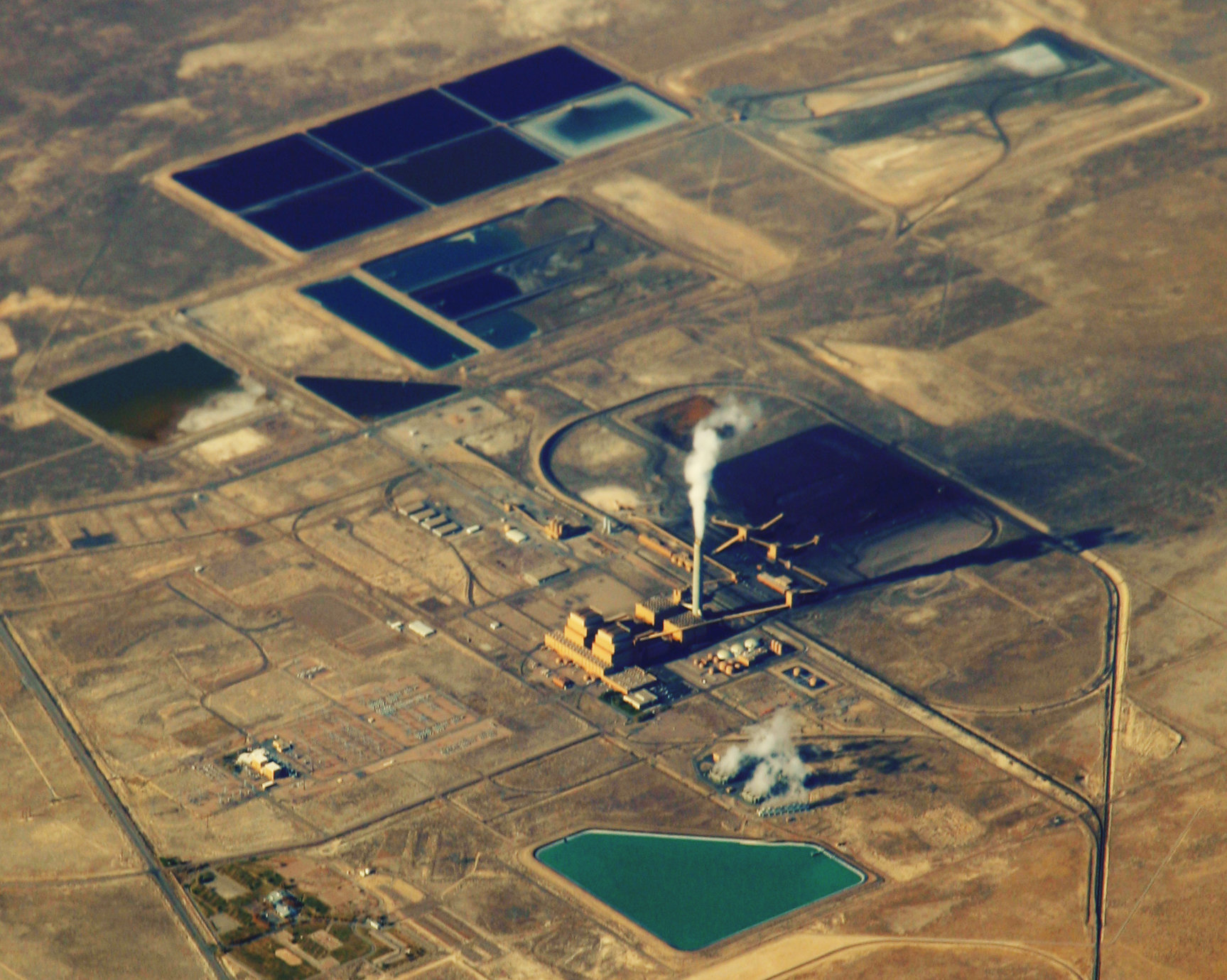
A coal-fired power plant with ash ponds

Bottom ash is part of the non-combustible residue of combustion in a power plant, boiler, furnace, or incinerator. In an industrial context, it has traditionally referred to coal combustion and comprises traces of combustibles embedded in forming clinkers and sticking to hot side walls of a coal-burning furnace during its operation. The portion of the ash that escapes up the chimney or stack is referred to as fly ash. The clinkers fall by themselves into the bottom hopper of a coal-burning furnace and are cooled. The above portion of the ash is also referred to as bottom ash.

Most bottom ash generated at U.S. power plants is stored in ash ponds, which can cause serious environmental damage if they experience structural failures.

== Ash handling processes ==
In a conventional water-impounded hopper (WIH) system, the clinker lumps get crushed to small sizes by clinker grinders mounted under water and fall down into a trough, where a water ejector takes them out to a sump. From there, it is pumped out by suitable rotary pumps. In another arrangement, a continuous link chain scrapes out the clinkers from under water and feeds them to clinker grinders outside the bottom ash hopper.

Modern municipal waste incinerators reduce the production of dioxins by incinerating at 850 to 950 degrees Celsius for at least two seconds, forming incinerator bottom ash as byproduct.

== Waste handling ==
In United States facilities, the ash waste is typically pumped to ash ponds, the most common disposal method. Some power plants operate a dry disposal system with landfills.

== Environmental impacts ==
In the United States, coal ash is a major component of the nation's industrial waste stream. In 2017, 38.2 million short tons (34.7×10^{6} t) of fly ash, and 9.7 million short tons (8.8×10^{6} t) of bottom ash, were generated. Coal contains trace levels of arsenic, barium, beryllium, boron, cadmium, chromium, thallium, selenium, molybdenum, and mercury, many of which are highly toxic to humans and other life. Coal ash, a product of combustion, concentrates these elements and can contaminate groundwater or surface waters if there are leaks from an ash pond.

Most U.S. power plants do not use geomembranes, leachate collection systems, or other flow controls often found in municipal solid waste landfills. Following a 2008 failure that caused the Tennessee Valley Authority's Kingston Fossil Plant coal fly ash slurry spill, the U.S. Environmental Protection Agency (EPA) began developing regulations that would apply to all ash ponds in the U.S. The EPA published its "Part A" final rule for Coal Combustion Residuals (CCR) on August 28, 2020, requiring all unlined ash ponds to retrofit with liners or close by April 11, 2021. Some facilities may apply to obtain additional time—up to 2028—to find alternatives for managing ash wastes before closing their surface impoundments. EPA published its "CCR Part B" rule on November 12, 2020, which would allow certain facilities to use an alternative liner, based on a demonstration that human health and the environment will not be affected. Further litigation on the CCR regulation is pending as of 2021. In 2020, several facilities applied for alternate liner demonstrations under the Part B rule. EPA has not made final determinations on the applications as of early 2026.

=== Ash recycling ===
Bottom ash can be extracted, cooled, and conveyed using dry ash handling technology. When left dry, the ash can be used to make concrete, bricks, and other useful materials. There are also several environmental benefits. Bottom ash may be used as raw alternative material, replacing earth or sand or aggregates, for example in road construction and in cement kilns (clinker production). A noticeable other use is as growing medium in horticulture (usually after sieving). In the United Kingdom it is known as furnace bottom ash (FBA), to distinguish it from incinerator bottom ash (IBA), the non-combustible elements remaining after incineration. A pioneer use of bottom ash was in the production of concrete blocks used to construct many high-rise flats in London in the 1960s.

== See also ==
- Coal combustion products
- Fly ash
- Health effects of coal ash
- Metal toxicity
- Industrial wastewater treatment
