= Virginia Department of Environmental Quality =

State government agency in Virginia

Agency overview
- Formed: 1993
- Headquarters: Richmond, Virginia
- Motto: "To protect and improve the environment for the well-being of all Virginians."
- Employees: 800
- Agency executive: Mike Rolband, Director
- Website: deq.virginia.gov

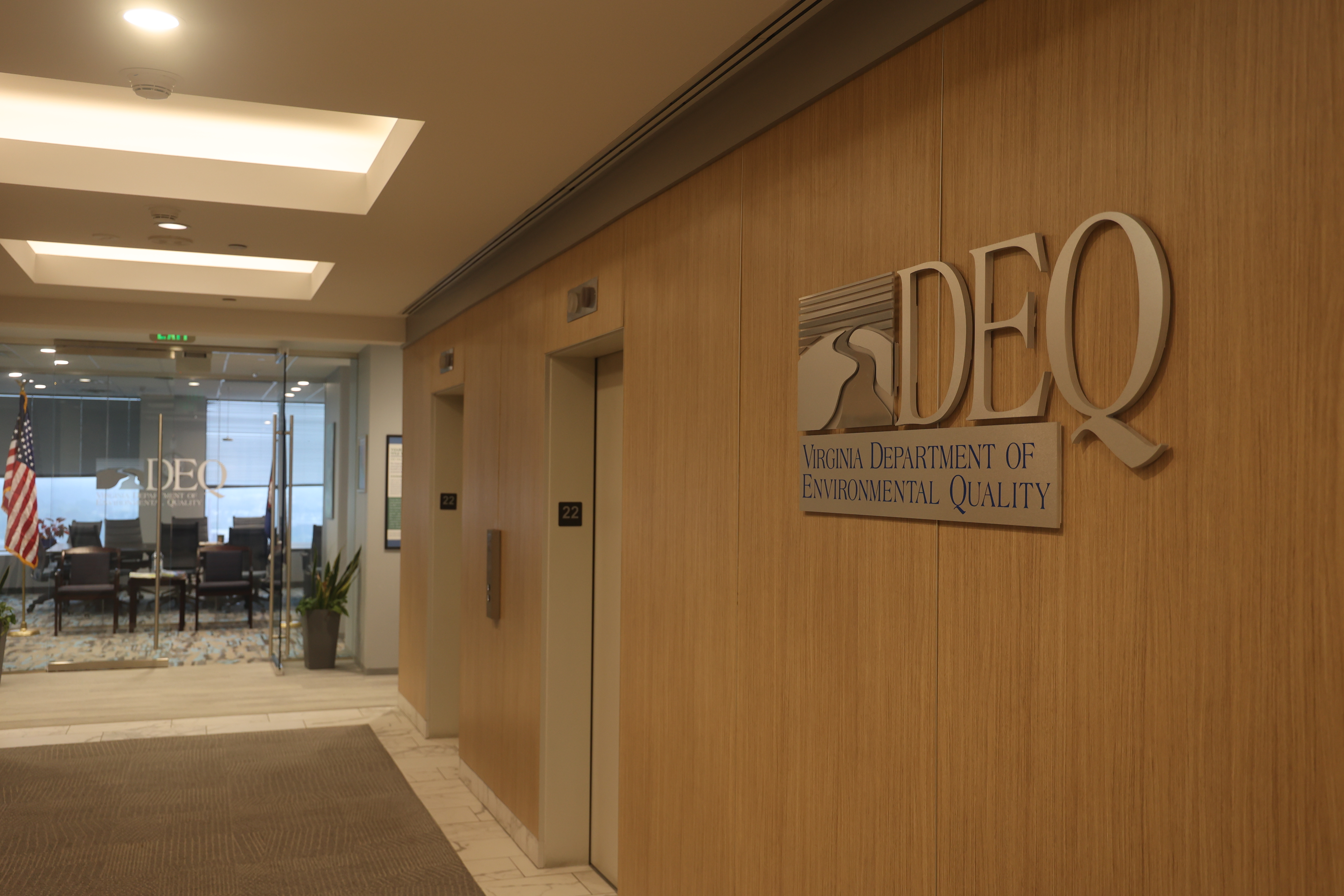
Virginia Department of Environmental Quality lobby

The Virginia Department of Environmental Quality (DEQ) is a state environmental agency that is responsible for administering laws and regulations related to air quality, water quality, water supply, renewable energy and land protection in the U.S. state of Virginia. DEQ was formed in 1993 through the consolidation of the Commonwealth's four main environmental agencies. DEQ issues environmental permits, conducts monitoring and inspections, and enforces the law. The agency currently has around 800 employees across seven offices in Virginia.

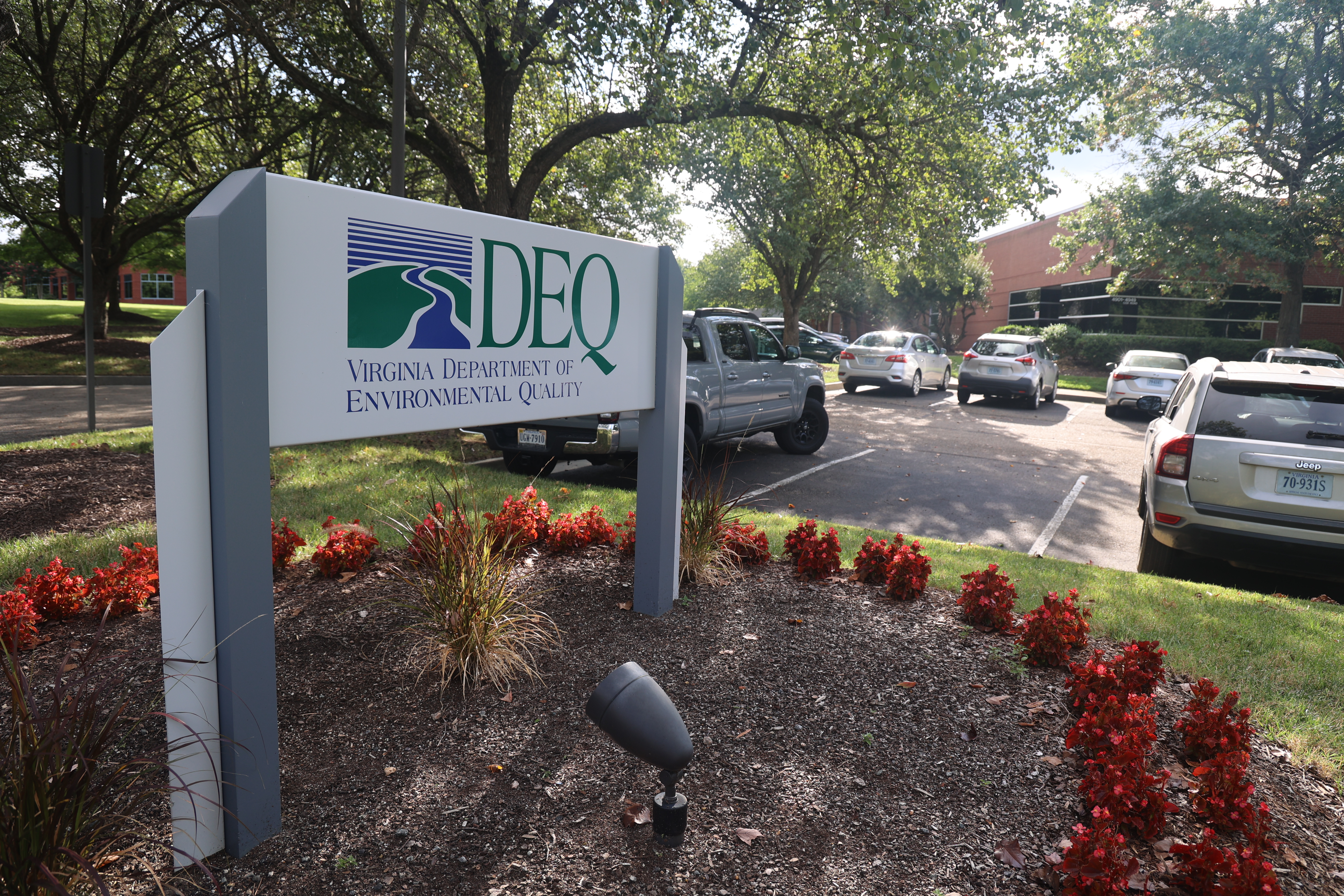
Virginia Department of Environmental Quality – Piedmont Regional Office

== Historical Timeline ==
- July 1, 1946: Virginia adopts the State Water Control Law, which establishes the State Water Control Board.
- 1952: Virginia Resource Use Education Council is formed.
- 1963: U.S. Congress approves Clean Air Act.
- July 1, 1966: Virginia adopts the Air Pollution Control Law, which establishes the Air Pollution Control Board.
- Dec. 2, 1970: U.S. Environmental Protection Agency (EPA) is formed.
- July 1, 1972: Virginia establishes the Council on the Environment as a state agency.
- 1986: Virginia establishes the Coastal Zone Management program.
- July 1, 1986: The Virginia Department of Waste Management is formed under the new secretary of natural resources. The Waste Management Board also is established.
- April 1, 1993: The Virginia Department of Environmental Quality is formed as a consolidation of the State Water Control Board, Air Pollution Control Board, Waste Management Board, and the Council on the Environment.

== Directors ==
- Richard N. Burton (1993-94)
- Peter W. Schmidt (1994-96)
- Thomas L. Hopkins (1996-98)
- Dennis H. Treacy (1998-2001)
- David A. Johnson (2002)
- Robert G. Burnley (2002-06)
- David K. Paylor (2006-2022)
- Michael S. Rolband (2022-present)
