= Joint cost =

Costs that cannot be traced back to a single cost object

Manufacturers incur many costs in the production process. It is the cost accountant's job to trace these costs back to a certain product or process (cost object) during production. Some costs cannot be traced back to a single cost object. Some costs benefit more than one product or process in the manufacturing process. These costs are called joint costs. Almost all manufacturers incur joint costs at some level the manufacturing process. It can also be defined as the cost to operate joint-product processes including the disposal of waste. With regard to joint costs, it is essential to allocate the joint cost for the different joint products for determining individual product costs. Several methods are used to allocate joint costs. These methods are mainly classified onto engineering and non-engineering methods. Nonengineering methods are mainly based on the market share of the product; the higher market share, the higher proportion assigned to it e.g. net realizable value. In this method, the proportions are determined based on the sales value proportions. In the engineering based method, proportions are found based on physical quantities and measurements such as volume, weight, etc.

Substantial costs of a flight (pilots, fuel, wear and tear on the plane, landing and takeoff fees) are a joint cost between carrying passengers and carrying freight, and underlie economies of scope across passenger and freight services. Some costs are specific to the services, for instance, meals and flight attendants are specific costs of carrying passengers.
