= Joint product =

Outputs created from a common input

In economics, joint product is a product that results jointly with other products from processing a common input; this common process is also called joint production. A joint product can be the output of a process with fixed or variable proportions.

== Examples ==
- The processing of crude oil can result in the joint products naphtha, gasoline, jet fuel, kerosene, diesel, heavy fuel oil and asphalt, as well as other petrochemical derivatives. The refinery process has variable proportions depending on the distilling temperatures and cracking intensity.
- Cogeneration delivers the joint products of heat and power; trigeneration provides cold, heat and power. With extraction steam turbines, cogeneration has variable proportions; with an internal combustion engine the proportions of heat and power are fixed.
- In a blast furnace, joint products are pig iron, slag and blast furnace gas. The iron is a precursor of steel, the slag can be sold as construction material, and the gas is used to reheat Cowper stoves. With variable process parameters of the iron smelting, the proportions are slightly variable.
- The chloralkali process, one of the basic processes in the chemical industry, is the electrolysis of sodium chloride (common salt) providing the joint products chlorine, sodium hydroxide and hydrogen. Due to the molar relation in the chemical equation, the proportions are fixed.

== Joint product pricing ==
In microeconomics, joint product pricing is the firm's problem of choosing prices for joint product, each of which is considered to be of value. Pricing for joint products is more complex than pricing for a single product. To begin with, there are two demand curves. The characteristics of each could be different. Demand for one product could be greater than for the other. Consumers of one product could be more price elastic than consumers of the other (and therefore more sensitive to changes in the product's price).

To complicate things further, both products, because they are produced jointly, share a common marginal cost curve. Their production could be linked in that they are bi-products (referred to as complements in production), or produced by the same inputs (referred to as substitutes in production). Further, production of the joint product could be in fixed proportions or in variable proportions.
