= Clinker (waste) =

Solid waste from certain industrial processes

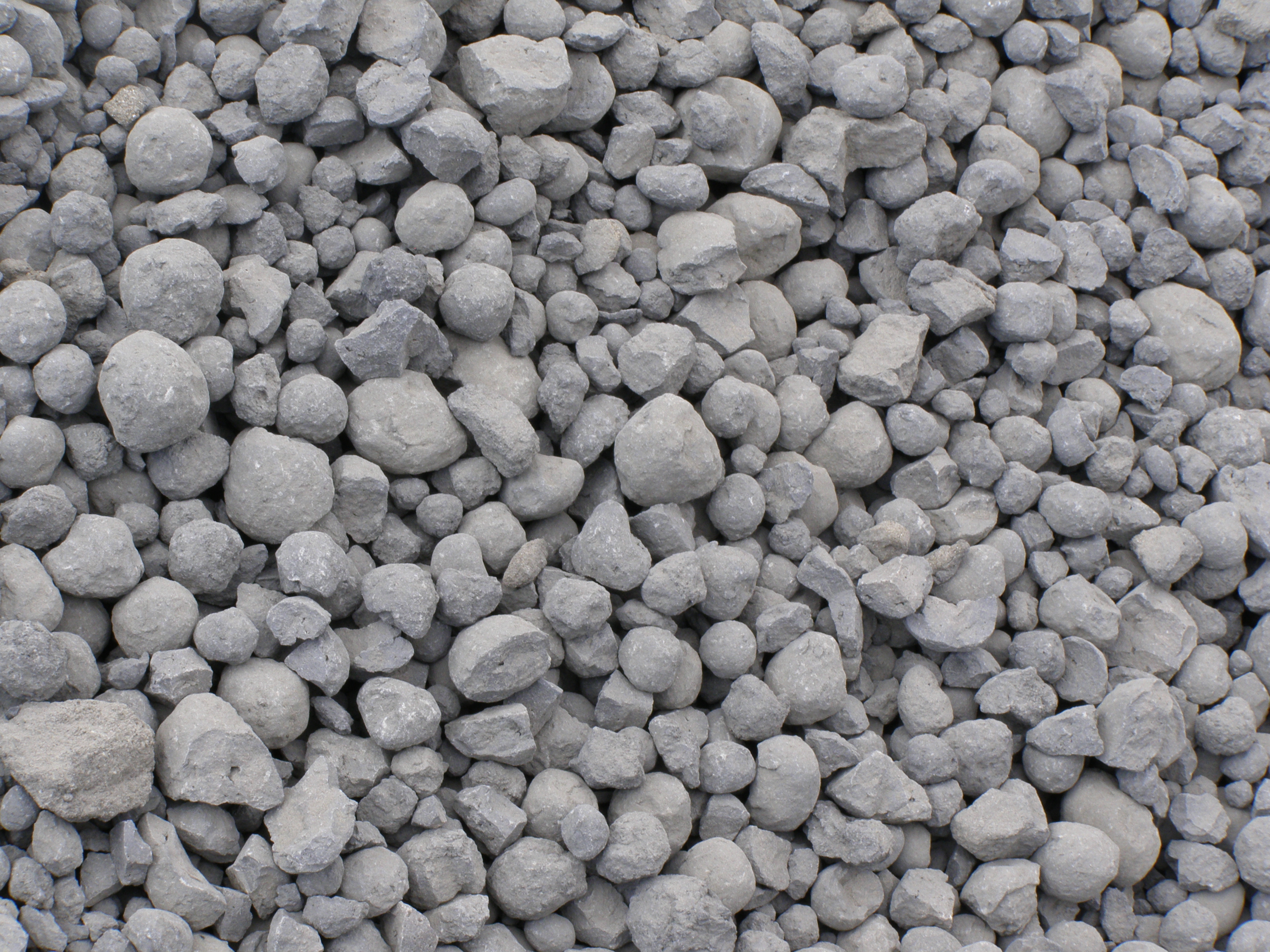
Clinker from a cement kiln

Clinker is a generic name given to waste from industrial processes, particularly those that involve smelting metals, welding, burning fossil fuels and use of a blacksmith's forge, which commonly causes a large buildup of clinker around the tuyere. Clinker often forms a loose, dark deposit consisting of waste materials such as coke, coal, slag, charcoal, and grit. Clinker often has a glassy look to it, usually because of the formation of molten silica compounds during processing. Clinker generally is much denser than coke, and, unlike coke, generally contains too little carbon to be of any value as fuel. It is also applied to the byproduct of combustion and heating by those who use anthracite or lignite coal-fired boilers.

Clinkers can occur naturally, for example in underground deposits of coal that have been altered by heat from coal-seam fires and nearby molten magma; volcanic clinkers are jagged pieces of lava that look similar to industrial clinker.

== Etymology ==
"Clinker" is from Dutch, and was originally used in English to describe clinker bricks. The term was later applied to hard residue, due to its similar appearance.

== Uses ==
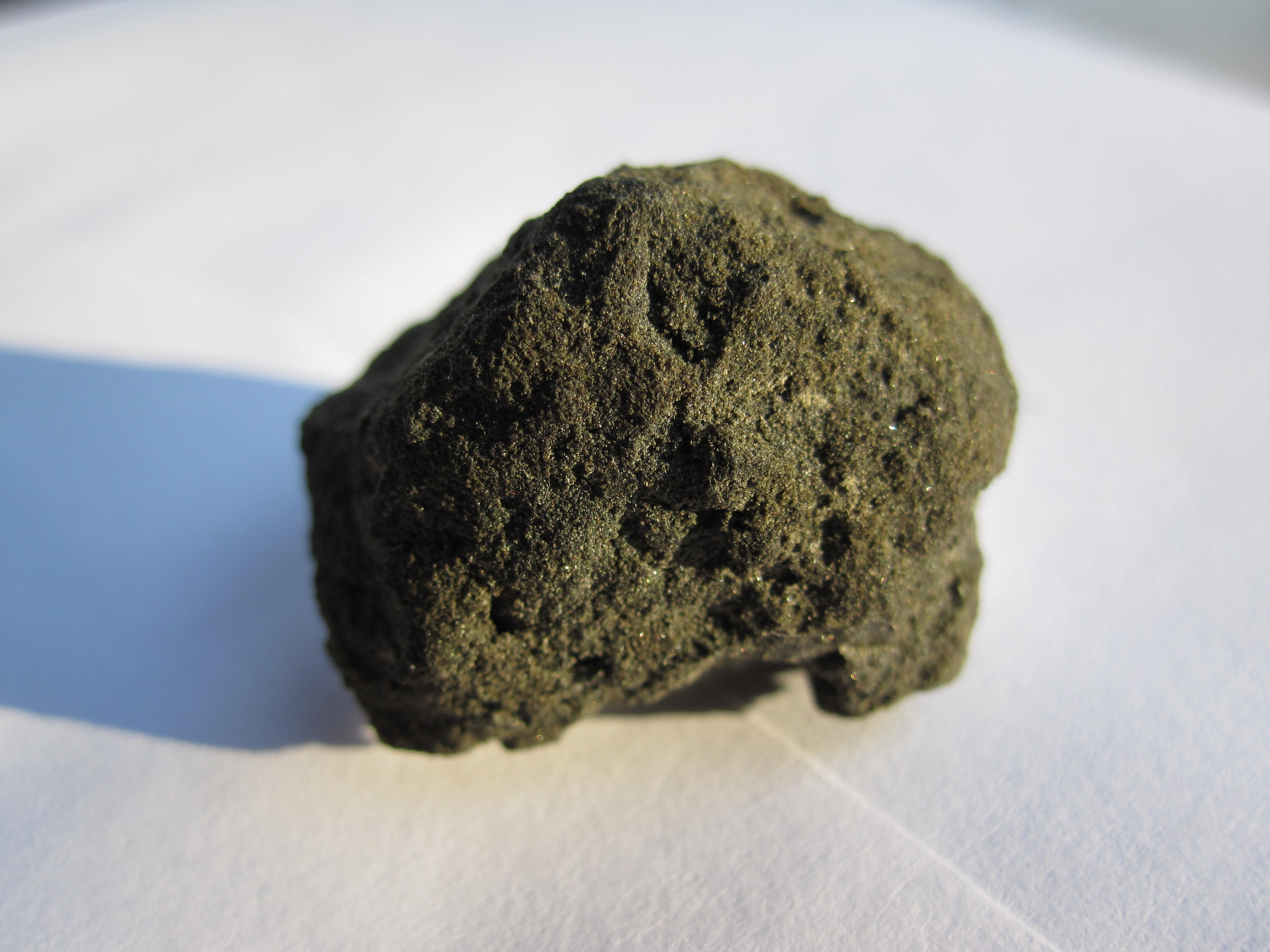
An individual piece of cement clinker

Clinker often is reused as a cheap material for paving footpaths. It is laid and rolled, and forms a hard path with a rough surface that presents less risk of slipping than most loose materials. In sufficient thickness such a layer drains well and is valuable for controlling muddiness. However, if laid without sufficient adhesive, it needs frequent rolling and addition of more clinker to maintain the path in good condition if it is subject to heavy foot traffic.

In sewage treatment works, the foul water is first screened to remove floating debris. Then it is sedimented to remove insoluble particles. After this, it is sprayed over a filter bed of clinker. Aerobic microbes soon grow in hollows in the clinker, where they kill harmful anaerobic bacteria in the water and remove much of the offensive organic waste.

Historically, clinker from coal-burning steamships simply was discarded overboard, leaving detectable trails on the seabed of some prominent steamship routes. As such, the deposits have proven to be of biological, historical and archaeological interest.

Naturally occurring clinkers exist. For example, the Powder River Basin is covered by clinkers from coal-seam fires, i.e., "baked, welded and molded rocks formed by the natural burning of coal beds."

== See also ==
- Construction
- Dross
- Industrial furnace
- Metallurgy
- Recycling
