= Operating leverage =

Measure of how revenue growth translates into growth in operating income

Operating leverage is a measure of how revenue growth translates into growth in operating income. It is a measure of leverage, and of how risky, or volatile, a company's operating income is.

== Definition ==
There are various measures of operating leverage, which can be interpreted analogously to financial leverage.

=== Costs ===
One analogy is "fixed costs + variable costs = total costs . . . is similar to . . . debt + equity = assets". This analogy is partly motivated because, for a given amount of debt, debt servicing is a fixed cost. This leads to two measures of operating leverage:

One measure is fixed costs to total costs:

$$\frac{\text{FC}}{\text{TC}}=\frac{\text{FC}}{\text{FC}+\text{VC}}$$

Compare to debt to value, which is

$$\frac{\text{Debt}}{\text{Assets}}=\frac{\text{Debt}}{\text{Debt}+\text{Equity}}$$

Another measure is fixed costs to variable costs:

$$\frac{\text{FC}}{\text{VC}}$$

Compare to debt to equity ratio:

$$\frac{\text{Debt}}{\text{Equity}}$$

Both of these measures depend on sales: if the unit variable cost is constant, then as sales increase, operating leverage (as measured by fixed costs to total costs or variable costs) decreases.

=== Contribution ===
Contribution Margin is a measure of operating leverage: the higher the contribution margin is (the lower variable costs are as a percentage of total costs), the faster the profits increase with sales. Note that unlike other measures of operating leverage, in the linear Cost-Volume-Profit Analysis Model, contribution margin is a fixed quantity, and does not change with Sales. Contribution = Sales - Variable Cost

=== DOL and Operating income ===
Operating leverage can also be measured in terms of change in operating income for a given change in sales (revenue).

The Degree of Operating Leverage (DOL) can be computed in a number of equivalent ways; one way it is defined as the ratio of the percentage change in Operating Income for a given percentage change in Sales (Brigham 1995, p. 426):

$$\text{DOL} = \frac{\%\text{ change in Operating Income}}{\% \text{ change in Sales}}$$

This can also be computed as Total Contribution Margin over Operating Income:

$$\text{DOL} = \frac{\text{Total Contribution}}{\text{Operating Income}} = \frac{\text{Total Contribution}}{\text{Total Contribution} - \text{Fixed Costs}} = \frac{(\text{P}-\text{V})\cdot \text{X}}{(\text{P}-\text{V})\cdot \text{X} - \text{FC}}$$

The above equivalence follows as the relative change in operating income with one more unit dX equals the contribution margin divided by operating income while the relative change in sales with one more unit dX equals price divided by revenue (or, in other words, 1 / X with X being the quantity).

Alternatively, as Contribution Margin Ratio over Operating Margin:

$$\text{DOL} = \frac{\text{Contribution Margin Ratio}}{\text{Operating Margin}}$$

For instance, if a company has sales of 1,000,000 units, at price $50, unit variable cost of $10, and fixed costs of $10,000,000, then its unit contribution is $40, its Total Contribution is $40m, and its Operating Income is $30m, so its DOL is

$$\frac{\$\text{40m}}{\$\text{30m}} = 1 \frac{1}{3} \approx 1.33$$

This could also be computed as 80% = $40m/$50m Contribution Margin Ratio divided by 60% = $30m/$50m Operating Margin.

It currently has Sales of $50m and Operating Income of $30m, so additional Unit Sales (say of 100,000 units) yield $5m more Sales and $4m more Operating Income: a 10% increase in Sales and a $10\% \times 1 \frac{1}{3}= 13\frac 1 3 \%$ increase in Operating Income.

Assuming the model, for a given level of sales, the DOL is higher the higher fixed costs are (an example): for a given level of sales and profit, a company with higher fixed costs has a lower Operating Income, and hence its Operating Income increases more rapidly with Sales than a company with lower fixed costs (and correspondingly lower contribution margin and higher Operating Income).

If a company has no fixed costs (and hence breaks even at zero), then its DOL equals 1: a 10% increase in Sales yields a 10% increase in Operating Income, and its operating margin equals its contribution margin:

$$\frac{\text{Operating Income}}{\text{Sales}}=\frac{\text{Unit Price} - \text{Unit Variable Cost}}{\text{Unit Price}}$$

DOL is highest near the break-even point; in fact, at the break-even point, DOL is undefined, because it is infinite: an increase of 10% in sales, say, increases Operating Income for 0 to some positive number (say, $10), which is an infinite (or undefined) percentage change; in terms of margins, its Operating Margin is zero, so its DOL is undefined. Similarly, for a very small positive Operating Income (say, $.1), a 10% increase in sales may increase Operating Income to $10, a 100x (or 9,900%) increase, for a DOL of 990; in terms of margins, its Operating Margin is very small, so its DOL is very large.

DOL is closely related to the rate of increase in the operating margin: as sales increase past the break-even point, operating margin rapidly increases from 0% (reflected in a high DOL), and as sales increase, asymptotically approaches the contribution margin: thus the rate of change in operating margin decreases, as does the DOL, which asymptotically approaches 1.

== Industry-specific ==
Examples of companies with high operating leverage include companies with high R&D costs, such as pharmaceuticals: it can cost billions to develop a drug, but then pennies to produce it. Hence from a life cycle cost analysis perspective, the ratio of preproduction costs (e.g. design widgets) versus incremental production costs (e.g. produce a widget) is a useful measure of operating leverage.

=== Outsourcing ===
Outsourcing a product or service is a method used to change the ratio of fixed costs to variable costs in a business. Outsourcing can be used to change the balance of this ratio by offering a move from fixed to variable cost and also by making variable costs more predictable.

== See also ==
- Cost accounting
- Efficiency ratio
- Operating margin
- Financial leverage
- Contribution margin
