= Profit-based sales targets =

The purpose of profit-based sales target metrics is "to ensure that marketing and sales objectives mesh with profit targets." In target volume and target revenue calculations, managers go beyond break-even analysis (the point at which a company sells enough to cover its fixed costs) to "determine the level of unit sales or revenues needed not only to cover a firm’s costs but also to attain its profit targets."

"In launching a program, managers often start with an idea of the dollar profit they desire and ask what sales levels will be required to reach it. Target volume (#) is the unit sales quantity required to meet an earnings goal. Target revenue ($) is the corresponding figure for dollar sales. Both of these metrics can be viewed as extensions of break-even analysis. ... Increasingly, marketers are expected to generate volumes that meet the target profits of their firm. This will often require them to revise sales targets as prices and costs change." In a survey of nearly 200 senior marketing managers, 71 percent responded that they found the "target revenues" metric very useful, while 70 percent found the "target volumes" metric to be very useful.

"Target volume: The volume of sales necessary to generate the profits specified in a company’s plans."

Target Volume (#) = [ Fixed costs ($) + Target Profits ($)] / Contribution per Unit ($)

"The formula for target volume will be familiar to those who have performed break-even analysis. The only change is to add the required profit target to the fixed costs. From another perspective, the break-even volume equation can be viewed as a special case of the general target volume calculation — one in which the profit target is zero, and a company seeks only to cover its fixed costs. In target volume calculations, the company broadens this objective to solve for a desired profit."

Target Revenue ($) = Target Volume (#) * Selling Price per Unit ($)

or

Target Revenue ($) = 100 * [ { Fixed Costs ($) + Target Profits ($) } / Contribution Margin (%) ]

== See also ==
- Target income sales
- Cost–volume–profit analysis
