= Overhead (business) =

Ongoing expense of operating a business

In business, an overhead or overhead expense is an ongoing expense of operating a business. Overheads are the expenditure which cannot be conveniently traced to or identified with any particular revenue unit, unlike operating expenses such as raw material and labor. Overheads cannot be immediately associated with the products or services being offered, and so do not directly generate profits. However, they are still vital to business operations as they provide critical support for the business to carry out profit-making activities. One example would be the rent for a factory, which allows workers to manufacture products which can then be sold for a profit. Such expenses are incurred for output generally and not for particular work order; e.g., wages paid to watch and ward staff, heating and lighting expenses of factory, etc. Overheads are an important cost element, alongside direct materials and direct labor.

Overheads are often related to accounting concepts such as fixed costs and indirect costs.

Overhead expenses are all costs on the income statement except for direct labor, direct materials, and direct expenses. Overhead expenses include accounting fees, advertising, insurance, interest, legal fees, labor burden, rent, repairs, supplies, taxes, telephone bills, travel expenditures, and utilities.

Business overheads fall into two main categories: administrative overheads and manufacturing overheads.

== Administrative overheads ==
Administrative overheads include items such as utilities, strategic planning, and various supporting functions. These costs are treated as overheads due to the fact that they are not directly related to any particular function of the organization, nor do they directly result in generating any profits. Instead, these costs simply take on the role of supporting all of the business's other functions.

Charities may refer to their administrative overheads as "core costs".

Universities regularly charge administrative overhead rates on research. In the U.S. the average overhead rate is 52%, which is spent on building operation, administrative salaries and other areas not directly tied to research. Academics have argued against these charges. For example, Benjamin Ginsberg showed how overhead rates are primarily used to subsidize ballooning administrative salaries and building depreciation, neither of which directly benefit research; although it does benefit the administrators that determine university policy in his book The Fall of Faculty. An article written by Joshua Pearce in Science argued that overhead accounting practices hurt science by removing funds from research and discouraging the use of less-expensive open-source hardware. He went into detail on the accounting, showing how millions were wasted each year on overhead cash grabs by university administrators in ZME Science.

=== Examples ===
==== Employee salaries ====
This includes mainly monthly and annual salaries that are agreed upon. They are considered overheads, as these costs must be paid regardless of sales and profits of the company. In addition, salary differs from wage as salary is not affected by working hours and time, therefore will remain constant. In particular, this would more commonly apply to more senior staff members as they are typically signed to longer-tenure contracts, meaning that their salaries are more commonly predetermined.

==== Office equipment and supplies ====
This includes office equipment such as printer, fax machine, computers, refrigerator, etc. They are equipment that do not directly result in sales and profits as they are only used for supporting functions that they can provide to business operations. However, equipment can vary between administrative overheads and manufacturing overheads based on the purpose of which they are using the equipment. For example, for a printing company, a printer would be considered a manufacturing overhead.

==== External legal and audit fees ====
This includes the cost of hiring external law and audit firms on behalf of the company. This would not apply if company has own internal lawyers and audit plans. Due to regulations and necessary annual audits to ensure a satisfactory work place environment, these costs often cannot be avoided. Also, since these costs do not necessarily contribute directly to sales, they are considered as indirect overheads. Although in most cases necessary, these costs can sometimes be avoided and reduced.

==== Company cars ====
Many companies provide usage of company cars as a perk for their employees. Since these cars do not contribute directly to sales and profits, they are considered an overhead. Similar company perks that are a one-off or constant payment such as partner contract fees with a gym will also fall under administrative overheads.

==== Travel and entertainment costs ====
This will include company-paid business travels and arrangements. As well as refreshments, meals, and entertainment fees during company gatherings. Although one might argue that these costs motivate workers to become more productive and efficient, the majority of economists agree that these costs do not directly contribute to sales and profits, therefore shall be categorized as an administrative overhead. Despite these costs occurring periodically and sometimes without prior preparation, they are usually one-off payments and are expected to be within the company's budget for travel and entertainment.

== Manufacturing overheads ==
Manufacturing overheads are all costs endured by a business that is within the physical platform in which the product or service is created. Difference between manufacturing overheads and administrative overheads is that manufacturing overheads are categorized within a factory or office in which the sale takes place. Whilst administrative overheads is typically categorized within some sort of back-office or supporting office. Although there are cases when the two physical buildings may overlap, it is the usage of the overheads that separates them.

=== Examples ===
==== Employee salaries ====
Although the general concept is identical to the example under administrative overheads, the key difference is the role of the employee. In the case of manufacturing overheads, employees would have roles such as maintenance personnel, manufacturing managers, materials management staff, and quality control staff. It would also include the set wages for janitorial staff members. Once again, the key difference lies in the nature of their respective jobs and the physical location in which their jobs are carried out.

==== Depreciation of assets and equipment ====
This refers to the reduction in value of equipments as it becomes older and more obsolete. For example, if a printer has a potential useful life span of 5 years, the amount that it can be sold for will decrease each year. Therefore, this value in depreciation is calculated as a manufacturing overhead. Moreover, this also applies to vehicles as they tend to depreciate significantly after the first year. When calculating manufacturing overheads, accountants mainly use two methods: straight-line method and declining balance method.

==== Property taxes on production facilities ====
Every single property unless government owned is subject to some form of property tax. Therefore, the taxes on production factories are categorized as manufacturing overheads as they are costs which cannot be avoided nor cancelled. In addition, property taxes do not change in relation to the business's profits or sales and will likely remain the same unless a change by the government administration.

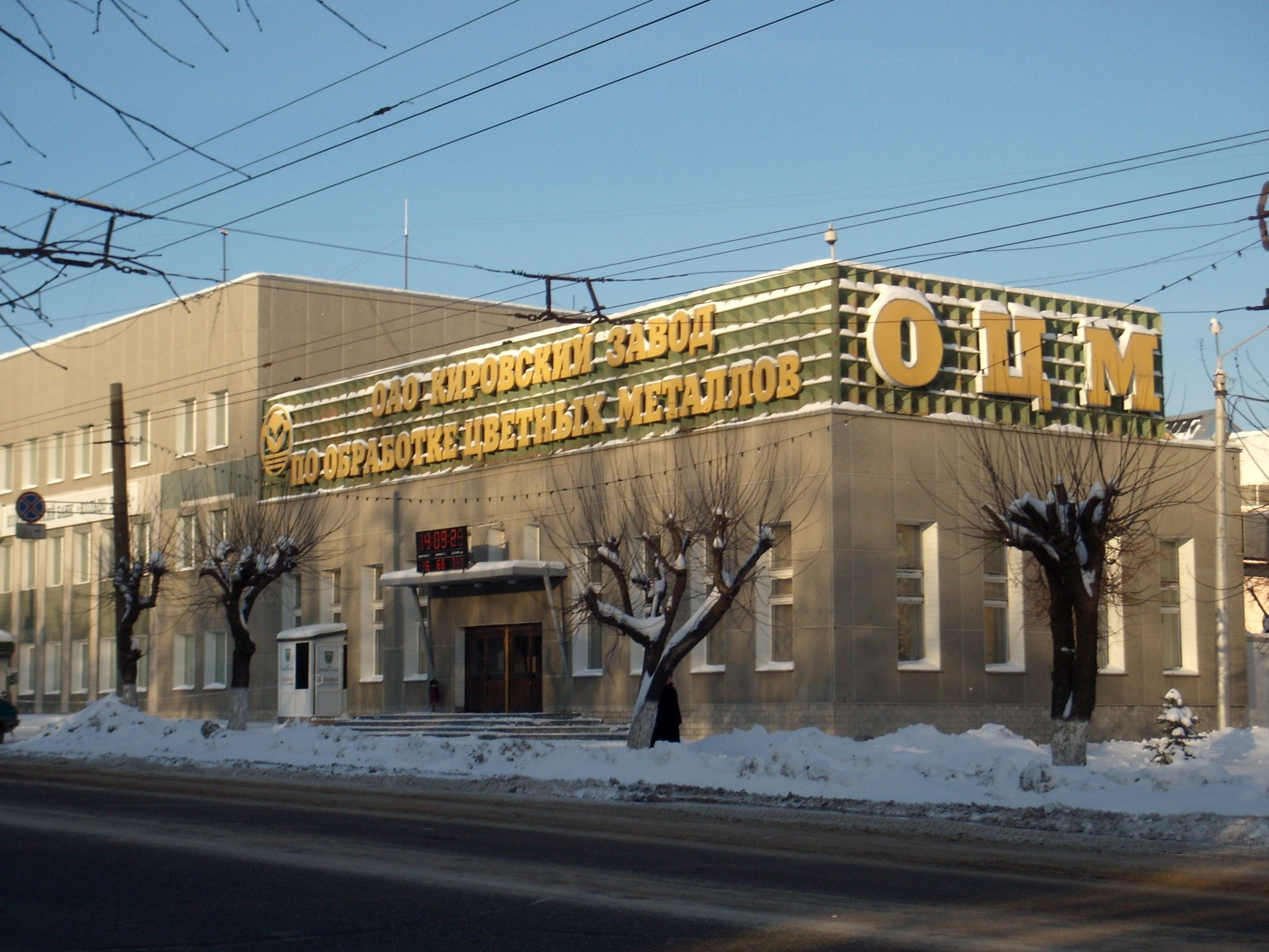
The rent for factory buildings is considered a manufacturing overhead

==== Rent of factory building ====
Unless the business decides to purchase land and build its own factory, it will be subject to some sort of rent due to the amount of capital required to build a privately owned factory. Therefore, this rent must be paid to the landlord on a regular basis regardless of the performance of the business. Although the rent for the building provides the physical platform for the company to produce its products and services, it is not a direct contributor.

==== Utilities for factory ====
This would vary depending on how the utility bill is structured. In the case of it being an overhead, the utility bill is pre-negotiated meaning that the monthly utility bill will be the same regardless of the amount in which the factory actually consumes. This will only be relevant in various countries where there is an option for standardized utility bills. However, due to the vast consumption of electricity, gas, and water in most factories, most companies tend to not have standardized utility bills as it tends to be more expensive. Standardized utility bills are also oftentimes discouraged by governments as it leads to wastage of resources and negative externalities of production.

== Application of business overheads ==
For most businesses, business overheads are calculated by accountants for budgeting purposes but also often so the business has an idea of how much they must charge consumers in order to make a profit. The following are common accounting tools which take account of business overheads.

A standard break-even analysis chart

=== Break-even analysis ===
The break-even analysis determines the point which the business's revenue is equivalent to the costs required to receive that revenue. It first calculates a margin of safety (the point which the revenue exceeds the break-even point) as that is the "safe" amount which the revenue can fall whilst still remaining to be above the break-even point. The graph on the right shows a typical break-even chart. Contribution refers to sales of the product or service, it can also be interpreted as the business's revenue stream. Fixed costs in this case serves the same purpose as business overheads, it will simply be shown as a straight horizontal line on the graph as shown.

=== Shut-down graph ===
In economics, revenue curves are often illustrated to show whether or not a business should stay in business, or shut down. In theory, if a business is able cover variable operational costs but unable to cover business overheads in the short run, the business should remain in business. On the other hand, if the business is not even able to cover operational costs, it should shut down. Although this rule largely differs depending on the size of the business, the business's cash-flow, and the competitive nature of the business, it serves as a model rule for most small competitive businesses to operate on.

=== Activity-based costing ===
Activity-based costing (ABC) aims to reduce the proportion of costs treated as overheads by allocating costs to each activity involved in the production of a product or delivery of a service.

=== Balance sheet ===
Balance sheet is a financial statement which outlines a company's financial assets, liabilities, and shareholder's equity at a specific time. Both assets and liabilities are separated into two categories depending on their time frame; current and long-term. Business overheads in particular fall under current liabilities as they are costs for which the company must pay on a relatively short-term/immediate basis. Although the balance sheet by itself does not offer much information, it is a useful piece of financial information when combined with other documents such as the income statement or ratio analysis as it offers a diverse and well-rounded description of the company's financial position.

== See also ==
- Operating expense
- Expense ratio
- Pre-determined overhead rate
