= Product cost management =

Management practice

Product cost management (PCM) is a set of tools, processes, methods, and culture used by firms who develop and manufacture products to ensure that a product meets its profit (or cost) target.

== Scope ==
There is not an agreed-upon definition for product cost management or an agreed scope for what it encompasses. Some people argue that PCM is a synonym for target costing. However, others argue that PCM is different, because target costing is a pricing method, whereas, PCM is focused on the maximum profit or minimum cost of a product, regardless of the price at which the product is sold to the end customer. Some analysts seem to equate PCM to design-to-cost.

Some practitioners of PCM are mostly concerned with the cost of the product up until the point that the customer takes delivery (e.g. manufacturing costs + logistics costs) or the total cost of acquisition. They seek to launch products that meet profit targets at launch rather than reducing the costs of a product after production. Other people believe that PCM extends to a total cost of ownership or lifecycle costing (Manufacturing + Logistics + operational costs + disposal). Depending on the practitioner, PCM may include any combination of organizational or /cultural change, processes, team roles, and tools. Many believe that PCM must encompass all four aspects to be successful and have shown how the four parts work together.

== Processes and activities ==
Depending on the scope the practitioner assigns to PCM, it may include one or more of the following processes.

- Change management and building a cost/profit-conscious culture
- Building cost management into the Product Lifecycle Management processes
- DFM – Design for Manufacturing
- DFA – Design for assembly
- DTC – Design to Cost
- DFP – Design for Procurement
- VA/VE – Value Analysis / Value engineering
- DFSS – Design for Six Sigma
- Cost targeting
- Should Cost / Price
- Make Buy
- Capital asset justification
- Commodity Pricing
- Spend analysis
- Cost-Volume-Profit Analysis

== Tools ==
Initially, PCM was done with pencil and paper. However, with the advent of computers, companies started to create internal software for predicting, controlling, minimizing, recording, and sharing product costs. With the invention of spreadsheets, PCM tools got a major boost in ease of use and adoption. In the late 1970s, specialized third-party software was developed that could do some of the activities included in PCM. Today, there are several tools that directly or indirectly promote themselves as “Product Cost Management” software solutions. Some of these tools also state that they can help users with problems of target costing, as well.

However, despite the creation of third-party tools, spreadsheets, specifically Microsoft Excel may still be, overwhelmingly, the most popular tool for PCM practitioners.

== Is PCM a software category? ==
In the mid-2000s, there was some discussion of whether PCM (sometimes referred to as Enterprise Cost Management) would become a separate software category or be part of one or more of the existing enterprise software categories of enterprise resource planning (ERP), product lifecycle management (PLM), or supply chain management (SCM). The vendors who make specialized PCM software have not yet gained the revenue necessary for the major industry analysts to proclaim PCM as its own category. However, there has been at least one analyst report focusing on product cost analytics. It is unknown whether PCM will become part of a bigger enterprise software category. At least one of the major ERP vendors and two of the major PLM vendors have products that they bill as Product Cost Management or analytics solutions.

== Purposes ==
The strategic purpose of PCM has been to maximize the profit of products through making a product the most cost efficient. Tactically, this has been accomplished by using the various PCM techniques and tools discussed above in a predictive way. That is, the tools are used to estimate a cost that is used as an absolute value for what a cost should be, or to relatively evaluate the cost of one design or manufacturing process or supplier versus another. In 2012, some experts in the PCM field have advocated that the purpose of PCM is not only to predict the most accurate cost, but also as a tool for leverage in negotiation.
