= TRS =

TRS may refer to:

== Finance and economics ==
- Taxable REIT subsidiaries, real estate investment trusts
- Teacher Retirement System of Texas, a pension plan
- Teachers' Retirement System of the State of Illinois, a pension agency
- Technical rate of substitution, marginal rate of technical substitution in economics
- Total return swap
- Total revenue share

== Organizations ==
- Telangana Rashtra Samithi, former name of Bharat Rashtra Samithi, a political party in Telangana, India
- ThalesRaytheonSystems, French-American aerospace and defense electronics company
- The Right Stuff (blog), a far-right podcasting site and blog
- Turtle Rock Studios, a video game developer

== Technology ==
- Telecommunications relay service, telephone service for the deaf
- Ticketing and Reservation System, China Railways
- Tip-Ring-Sleeve, a phone connector type
- Timing Reference Signal in serial digital interface for video
- Term rewriting system in mathematics
- Transmission Raman spectroscopy
- TRS-80, a Tandy Radio Shack personal computer

== Transportation codes ==
- TRS, IATA code for Friuli Venezia Giulia Airport, near Trieste, Italy
- TRS, ICAO code for AirTran Airways, in Orlando, Florida, US

== Other uses ==
- Theatre Royal Sydney, a theatre in Sydney, Australia
- Trainz Railroad Simulator, a series of computer games
- Toyota Racing Series, a car racing series based in New Zealand
- Two-round system, an electoral system where the two candidates with the most votes head to a second round
