= Partial productivity =

Measurement of partial productivity refers to the measurement solutions which do not meet the requirements of total productivity measurement, yet, being practicable as indicators of total productivity. In practice, measurement in production means measures of partial productivity. In that case, the objects of measurement are components of total productivity, and interpreted correctly, these components are indicative of productivity development.

The term of partial productivity illustrates well the fact that total productivity is only measured partially – or approximately. In a way, measurements are defective but, by understanding the logic of total productivity, it is possible to interpret correctly the results of partial productivity and to benefit from them in practical situations.

== Solutions ==
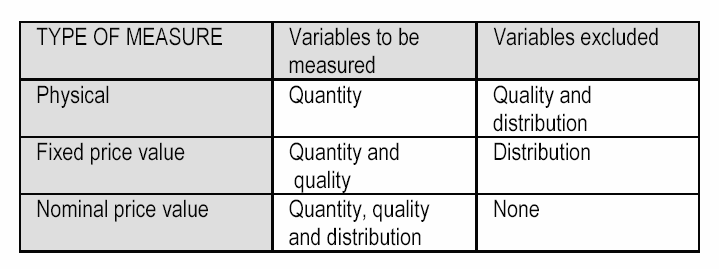
Comparison of basic measure types (Saari 2006)

Typical solutions of partial productivity are:

- Single-factor productivity: Single-factor productivity refers to the measurement of productivity that is a ratio of output and one input factor. A most well-known measure of single-factor productivity is the measure of output per work input, describing work productivity.
- Value-added productivity: Sometimes it is practical to employ the value added as output. Productivity measured in this way is called Value-added productivity.
- Unit cost accounting: Productivity can also be examined in cost accounting using unit costs. Then it is mostly a question of exploiting data from standard cost accounting for productivity measurements.
- Efficiency ratios: Efficiency ratios, which tell something about the ratio between the value produced and the sacrifices made for it, are available in large numbers.
- Managerial control ratio system: Managerial control ratio systems are composed of single measures which are interpreted in parallel with other measures related to the subject. Ratios may be related to any success factor of the area of responsibility, such as profitability, quality, position on the market, etc. Ratios may be combined to form one whole using simple rules, hence, creating a key figure system.

== Measurement ==
The measures of partial productivity are physical measures, nominal price value measures and fixed price value measures. These measures differ from one another by the variables they measure and by the variables excluded from measurements. By excluding variables from measurement makes it possible to better focus the measurement on a given variable, yet, this means a more narrow approach. The table below was compiled to compare the basic types of measurement. The first column presents the measure types, the second the variables being measured, and the third column gives the variables excluded from measurement.

== See also ==
- Productive efficiency
