= List of most expensive films =

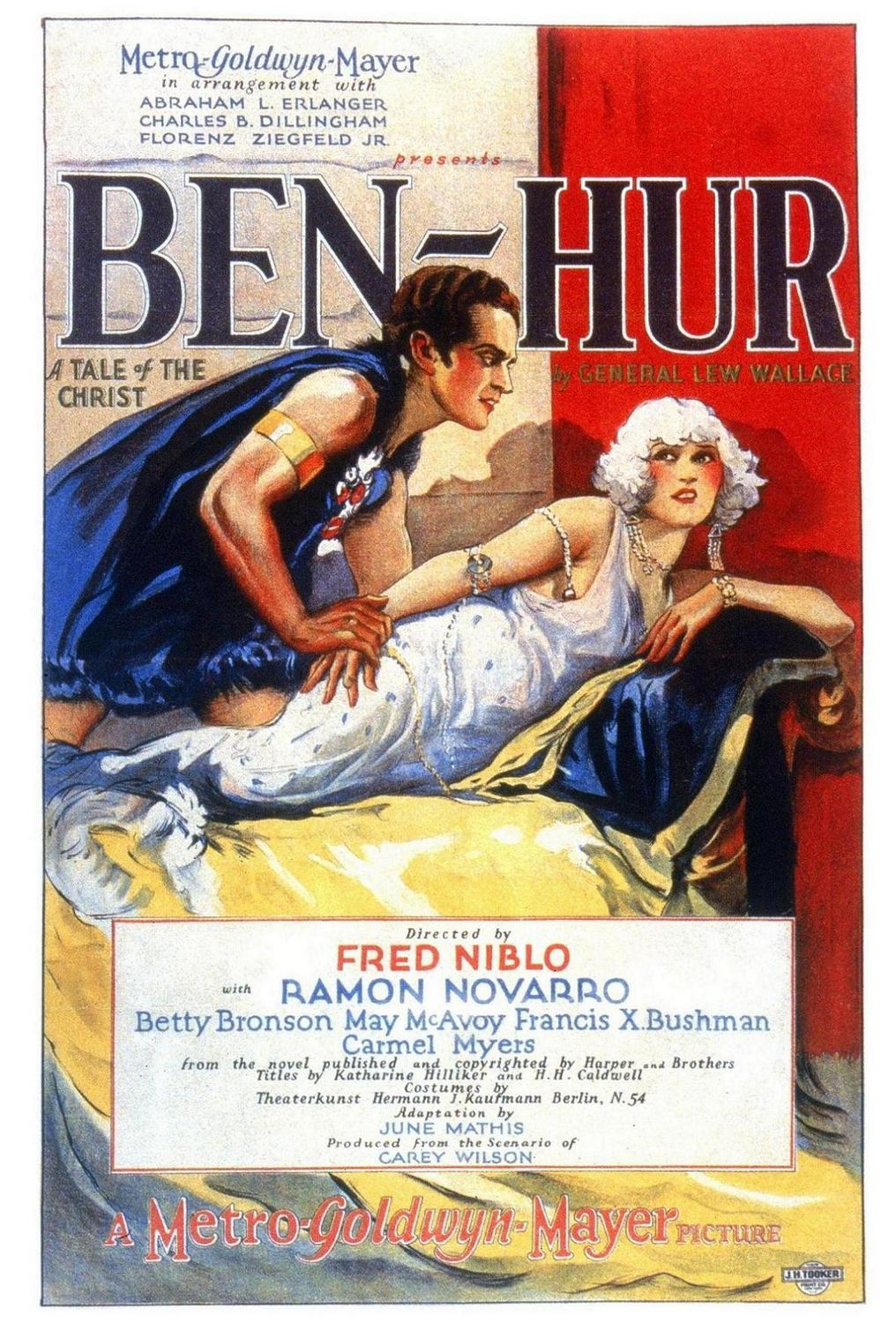
Ben-Hur (1925) was the most expensive film of the silent era, possibly holding the record for over twenty years.

It is not clear which film is the most expensive ever made, due to the secretive nature of Hollywood accounting. Jurassic World Dominion holds the official record with a net budget of $549 million. The production of the third and fourth Avengers films—Infinity War and Endgame—stands as the most expensive back-to-back film production, with a cost of over $1 billion.

Inflation, filming techniques, and external market forces affect the cost of film production. Costs rose steadily during the silent era; 1925's Ben-Hur: A Tale of the Christ set a record that lasted well into the sound era. Television had an impact on rising costs in the 1950s and early 1960s as cinema competed with it for audiences; 1963's highest-earning film, Cleopatra, did not recoup its costs on its original release. The 1990s saw two thresholds crossed: 1994's True Lies cost $100 million and 1997's Titanic cost $200 million, both directed by James Cameron. The 21st century has so far seen the $300 million and $400 million thresholds crossed and it has become normal for a tent-pole feature from a major film studio to cost over $200 million, and an increasing number of films now cost more than $300 million.

This list contains only films already released to the general public and not films that are still in production or post-production, as costs can change during the production process. Listed below is the net negative cost: the costs of the actual filming, not including promotional costs (i.e. advertisements, commercials, posters, etc.) and after accounting for tax subsidies. The charts are ordered by budgets that have been independently audited or officially acknowledged by the production companies where they are known; most companies will not give a statement on the actual production costs, so often only estimates by professional researchers and movie industry writers are available. Where budget estimates conflict, the productions are charted by lower-bound estimates.

== Most expensive productions (unadjusted for inflation) ==
Productions with a net budget of over $200 million in nominal U.S. dollars are listed here. Due to inflation, all of the films on the chart have been produced in the 21st century.

Most expensive films
Rank	Title	Year	Cost (est.) (millions)	Refs and notes
1	Jurassic World Dominion	2022	^{*}$549	(Note: Financial statements filed in the United Kingdom show that production costs for Jurassic World: Dominion totaled $683.7 million, offset against a tax rebate of $131.4 million and a $3.7 million Coronavirus job retention subsidy, bringing the net spend on the film to $548.6 million.)
2	Star Wars: The Force Awakens	2015	^{*}$536	(Note: Financial statements filed in the United Kingdom reveal the full, audited, net production costs for the following Star Wars films: The Force Awakens: $535.5 million ($638.9 million before applying the tax credit). Variety previously reported the cost of the film as $306 million (including a $47.4 million rebate), but Disney had not submitted all of the accounts to HM Revenue and Customs at this point.; Rogue One: $271 million ($327.5 million before applying the tax credit); The Last Jedi: $343.2 million ($414.6 million before applying the tax credit); Solo: A Star Wars Story: $299.8 million ($365.7 million before applying the tax credit); The Rise of Skywalker: $490.2 million ($593.7 million before applying the tax credit))
3	Star Wars: The Rise of Skywalker	2019	^{*}$490	
4	Jurassic World: Fallen Kingdom	2018	^{*}$465	(Note: Financial statements filed in the United Kingdom show that production costs for Jurassic World: Fallen Kingdom totaled $555.4 million, offset against a tax rebate of $90.9 million, bringing the net spend on the film to $464.5 million.)
5	Deadpool & Wolverine	2024	^{*}$446	(Note: Financial statements filed in the United Kingdom show that production costs for Deadpool & Wolverine totaled $556.8 million up to October 2025, offset against a tax rebate of $110.7 million, bringing the net spend on the film to $446.1 million.)
6	Fast X	2023	^{*}$379	(Note: Financial statements filed in the United Kingdom show that production costs for Fast X totaled $453.6 million up to August 2023, offset against a tax rebate of $74.8 million, bringing the net spend on the film to $378.8 million.)
7	Pirates of the Caribbean: On Stranger Tides	2011	^{*}$379	(Note: Financial statements filed in the United Kingdom show that production costs for Pirates of the Caribbean: On Stranger Tides totaled $410.6 million between October 2009 and April 2013 offset by a tax rebate of $32.1 million.)
8	Avengers: Age of Ultron	2015	^{*}$365	(Note: Disney spent $444 million on Avengers: Age of Ultron but $79 million of this was offset by payments from the UK tax authority.)
9	Avengers: Endgame	2019	$356	(Note: The third and fourth films in the Avengers series, Infinity War (2018) and Endgame (2019) were filmed back-to-back as a joint production, so it is not known exactly how much each film on its own cost. In an interview with Victoria Alonso, executive vice-president of physical production for Marvel Studios, The Hollywood Reporter placed the budget for Infinity War at "upwards of $300 million". Deadline Hollywood estimated the cost of Infinity War at $325 million, and the cost of Endgame at $356 million, for a combined cost of $681 million. Other figures from official sources suggest that Deadline has under-estimated the cost of the productions. Publicly available financial statements filed to HM Revenue and Customs for Assembled Productions III (the United Kingdom-registered company that Disney created for the purpose of qualifying for a tax credit) show that between 2017 and 2024 the combined expenditure ("cost of sales") on both productions was £247.52 million (2017), £429.95 million (2018), £293.45 million (2019), £28.09 million (2020), £3.90 million (2021), £3.43 million (2022), £2.42 million (2023) and £2.81 million (2024) for a total of £1.012 billion (before deducting the £34 million tax credit). Between June 2016 (the start of the accounting period for Assembled Productions III) and the end of 2019, the dollar-to-pound conversion rate fluctuated between $1.20 and $1.43 to £1, which would convert the combined gross budget to a minimum $1.2 billion. There is a considerable disparity between the combined cost of the individual Deadline estimates ($681 million), and the combined cost deduced from the UK tax filings ($1.2 billion). However, in 2023, Joe Russo (one of the directors) stated in an interview that "each of those movies was $500 million plus", confirming that the combined costs exceeded $1 billion.)
10	Indiana Jones and the Dial of Destiny	2023	^{*}$352	(Note: Financial statements filed in the United Kingdom in 2024 reveal that a total of $419 million (£320.1 million) had been spent on production. Dial of Destiny received $66.7 million (£50.3 million) from the UK government bringing its net spending down to $352.3 million.)
11	Doctor Strange in the Multiverse of Madness	2022	^{*}$351	(Note: Financial statements filed in the United Kingdom show that production costs for Doctor Strange in the Multiverse of Madness totaled $414.9 million up to May 2023, offset against a tax rebate of $64.3 million, bringing the net spend on the film to $350.6 million.)
12	Avatar: The Way of Water	2022	$350	(Note: The precise budget of Avatar: The Way of Water is vague. At the lower end of estimates Variety reported that the film cost $350 million to make, whilst Deadline Hollywood has reported that its sources put the production costs at around $460 million. The Hollywood Reporter reported the budget as "in the $350 million to $400 million range".)
12	Avatar: Fire and Ash	2025	$350	(Note: The budget for Avatar: Fire and Ash has been reported as $350 million and $400 million, by Variety.)
14	Star Wars: The Last Jedi	2017	^{*}$343	
15	Ant-Man and the Wasp: Quantumania	2023	^{*}$330	(Note: Financial statements filed in the United Kingdom show that production costs for Ant-Man and the Wasp: Quantumania totaled $388.4 million up to 2023, offset against a tax rebate of $58.3 million, resulting in a net budget of $330.1 million.)
16	Avengers: Infinity War	2018	$325	
17	The Electric State	2025	$320	
18	The Marvels	2023	^{*}$307	(Note: Financial statements filed in the United Kingdom show that production costs for The Marvels totaled $374 million, offset by a $66.6 million tax rebate which brought down the net spend to $307.4 million.)
19	Pirates of the Caribbean: At World's End	2007	$300	(Note: Pirates of the Caribbean: Dead Man's Chest and Pirates of the Caribbean: At World's End were produced together on a combined budget of $450 million. Budget overruns reportedly pushed the final cost of the joint production up to a total of $500 million. The individual budget estimates—which come to around $525 million—conjecture how the overall budget was divided between the two films, but many of the costs are indivisible such as the fees for the actors who appeared in both films and would most likely have been contracted for a single fee, and the cost of the sets common to both films.)
19	Justice League	2017	$300	(Note: In addition to the original $300 million budget for Justice League, a further $70 million was spent on finishing visual effects for the director's cut along with five minutes worth of additional footage.)
19	Solo: A Star Wars Story	2018	^{*}$300	
19	Mission: Impossible – The Final Reckoning	2025	$300	(Note: The budget for Mission: Impossible – Final Reckoning has been widely reported to be $300–400 million, with The Hollywood Reporter reporting the final cost to be at the upper end of this range.)
23	Mission: Impossible – Dead Reckoning Part One	2023	$291	(Note: The net budget for Mission: Impossible – Dead Reckoning Part One was $291 million, according to Deadline Hollywood. Paramount received a £57 million insurance payout due to the COVID-19 pandemic delaying production, but it is not clear whether this has been factored into the net budget figure.)
24	Snow White	2025	^{*}$272	(Note: Financial statements filed in the United Kingdom show that production costs for Snow White totaled $336.5 million up to December 2024, offset against a tax rebate of $64.9 million, bringing the net spend on the film to $271.6 million.)
25	Rogue One	2016	^{*}$271	
26	John Carter	2012	^{*}$264	(Note: Financial statements filed in the United Kingdom show that production costs for John Carter totaled $306.6 million between 2010 and 2013 offset against a tax rebate of $42.9 million. The net budget was $263.7 million, a figure consistent with Disney's claim that the film cost "around $250 million".)
27	Batman v Superman: Dawn of Justice	2016	$263	(Note: The budget for Batman v Superman was at least $250 million, after rebates and tax incentives, with the gross figure as high as $325 million. FilmL.A. estimates the gross budget at $300 million, before factoring in an incentive of $37 million.)
28	Tangled	2010	$260	
29	Spider-Man 3	2007	^{*}$258	
30	Beauty and the Beast	2017	^{*}$255	
31	Eternals	2021	^{*}$254	(Note: Financial statements filed in the United Kingdom reveal that a total of $292.2 million (£241.6 million) had been spent on production as of 31 August 2023. Eternals received $38.6 million (£31.9 million) from the UK government bringing its net spending down to $253.6 million.)
32	Harry Potter and the Half-Blood Prince	2009	$250	
32	Furious 7	2015	$250	(Note: The budget for Furious 7 was initially pegged at $190 million. However, according to Variety, the film was completed using previously unseen footage of the late Paul Walker and stand-in body doubles which led to the film's budget spiralling up to $250 million. This increased was also acknowledged by Deadline Hollywood in its profit analysis report for the film a year after its release.)
32	The Fate of the Furious	2017	$250	(Note: The budget for The Fate of the Furious was $250 million, after taking an incentive of $20 million into account.)
32	The Lion King	2019	$250	(Note: A source told The Hollywood Reporter that the budget for The Lion King was "roughly $250 million", although Deadline Hollywood reported the film cost over $260 million. The New York Times estimated that the film cost $400 million to produce and market.)
32	No Time to Die	2021	$250	(Note: In 2019 The Hollywood Reporter estimated the budget of No Time to Die at $250 million, but Variety have since published that the film cost $301 million.)
32	Thor: Love and Thunder	2022	$250	
32	Black Panther: Wakanda Forever	2022	$250	
32	Guardians of the Galaxy Vol. 3	2023	$250	
32	Toy Story 5	2026	$250	
32	Moana	2026	$250	
32	The Odyssey	2026	$250	
43	Black Widow	2021	^{*}$248	(Note: The budget for Black Widow was originally reported by Variety to be around $200 million. However, financial statements that have since been filed in the United Kingdom show that production costs totaled $288.5 million, offset by a $41 million tax rebate.)
44	Spectre	2015	$245	(Note: Internal memos that were leaked during the Sony Pictures Entertainment hack revealed that the budget for Spectre at the time stood in the "mid $300Ms" with Sony actively pursuing measures to reduce the expenditure. The leaked figure continues to be widely reported by the media, but after rebates the production ultimately cost $245–250 million.)
45	The Little Mermaid	2023	^{*}$240	(Note: Financial statements filed in the United Kingdom reveal that a total of $297 million (£243.5 million) had been spent on production as of 31 August 2022. The Little Mermaid received $56.8 million (£46.6 million) from the UK government bringing its net spending down to $240.2 million.)
46	Avatar	2009	^{*}$237	(Note: Estimates for Avatar's cost have varied considerably with some as high as $500 million. The $500 million figure also incorporates the $150 million marketing budget, and the costs of developing the necessary 3-D cameras and motion capture technology which were independently financed by private investors and none of which are included in the production cost. Recent estimates put the production costs at about $310 million, although a 15% tax rebate from New Zealand is expected to reduce the final bill by $25–30 million, which would ultimately put the cost at around $280 million. Avatar was initially budgeted at $190 million but the studio later acknowledged it cost $237 million after its budget came under intense media scrutiny. A further $1 million per minute were spent on the nine minutes of extra footage in Avatar: Special Edition.)
47	The Dark Knight Rises	2012	$230	(Note: Expenditure on The Dark Knight Rises is estimated to be about $250–300 million, with the cost of production coming down to around $230 million after tax credits.)
47	Captain America: Civil War	2016	$230	(Note: The budget for Captain America: Civil War was $250 million before taking an incentive of $20 million into account.)
47	Pirates of the Caribbean: Dead Men Tell No Tales	2017	$230	
50	Maleficent	2014	$226	(Note: The budget for Maleficent was $263 million before taking an incentive of $37 million into account.)
51	The Chronicles of Narnia: Prince Caspian	2008	^{*}$225	
51	The Lone Ranger	2013	^{*}$225	(Note: Studio reps for Disney state the cost of the production was $225 million, although other estimates put the film's cost at around $250 million with over $150 million spent on worldwide marketing and distribution.)
51	Pirates of the Caribbean: Dead Man's Chest	2006	$225	
51	Man of Steel	2013	$225	(Note: People close to Warner and the film's production offered slightly different estimates for its final cost, ranging between $225 million and $270 million, split between the studio and Legendary Pictures LLC.)
51	Superman	2025	$225	(Note: Even though the net budget for Superman has been widely reported as being $225 million, documents filed by the production team with the Ohio government seeking incentives listed the gross budget as $363.8 million, although this was disputed by the film's director, James Gunn. However, a longtime financier maintains the higher figure is correct.)
51	Spider-Man: Brand New Day	2026	$225	
57	The Avengers	2012	$220	
58	The Hobbit: The Desolation of Smaug	2013	^{*}$217	
58	Transformers: The Last Knight	2017	^{*}$217	(Note: The studio stated the budget for Transformers: The Last Knight was $217 million; however FilmL.A. estimates the gross budget at $260 million, before factoring in an incentive of $21 million.)
60	Men in Black 3	2012	^{*}$215	(Note: Some estimates put the production budget for Men in Black 3 at nearly $250 million; however, a $38 million tax rebate from New York is expected to bring the final cost down to about $215 million.)
60	Oz the Great and Powerful	2013	^{*}$215	(Note: Disney claimed that Oz the Great and Powerful cost $215 million, although an insider suggests its cost was approximately $235 million.)
62	X-Men: The Last Stand	2006	$210	
62	Transformers: Age of Extinction	2014	$210	
62	Gladiator II	2024	$210	(Note: According to The Hollywood Reporter, Gladiator II was original budgeted at $165 million, but that figure was reported to have ballooned to $310 million. Paramount insiders insist the net cost was "under $250 million". Deadline Hollywood has invariably reported the net budget as being $210 million and $250 million.)
66	Battleship	2012	^{*}$209	
66	Dawn of the Planet of the Apes	2014	$209	(Note: The budget for Dawn of the Planet of the Apes was $235 million before taking an incentive of $26.4 million into account.)
66	The Hobbit: The Battle of the Five Armies	2014	$209	(Note: The budget for The Hobbit: The Battle of the Five Armies was $250 million before factoring in a tax rebate of $41 million.)
69	King Kong	2005	$207	
70	Ramayana: Part 1	2026	$206	(Note: Ramayana: Part 1 and Part 2 were filmed back-to-back at a combined cost of ₹4,000 crore, with the cost of Part 1 estimated at ₹2,000 crore in court proceedings. Filming commenced in April 2024 and, between then and the film's release in November 2026, the Indian rupee has traded between a low of INR 82.65955 and a high of 97.12029 to 1 USD. At these rates, the budget for Ramayana: Part 1 would convert to $206–242 million. This is consistent with the $200–250 million budget reported by the Los Angeles Times.)
71	X-Men: Days of Future Past	2014	$205	(Note: Most reports put the cost of X-Men: Days of Future Past at around $200 million, but The Wall Street Journal gives a precise net figure of $215 million.)
71	Tenet	2020	$205	
71	Aquaman and the Lost Kingdom	2023	$205	
74	Superman Returns	2006	^{*}$204	(Note: Warner Bros. put the production cost of Superman Returns at $223 million, and around $204 million after factoring in tax credits. Some other estimates place the figure higher, but these higher numbers include the development costs of earlier aborted projects, taking the total figure to $263 million. Warner later stated it cost $209 million, although the film's director Bryan Singer maintains that the approved budget was $184.5 million, and it eventually came in at $204 million: "So the hard, honest number is $204 million.")

Most expensive back-to-back film productions
Rank	Titles	Years	Cost (est.) (millions)	Refs and notes
1	Avengers: Infinity War Avengers: Endgame	2018–19	$1,000	
2	The Hobbit trilogy	2012–14	^{*}$623	(Note: Financial documents filed in New Zealand show that production costs on The Hobbit trilogy totaled $745 million through March 2014 against a $122 million tax rebate.)
3	Pirates of the Caribbean: Dead Man's Chest Pirates of the Caribbean: At World's End	2006–07	$450	
4	The Hunger Games: Mockingjay – Part 1 and Part 2	2014–15	$300	
5	The Lord of the Rings trilogy	2001–03	^{*}$260	(Note: WingNut Films stated that the budget for the three Lord of the Rings films was $260 million, however estimates of the cost during production varied from $270 million to $360 million, none of which were confirmed or denied by WingNut. Other estimates put the final cost at $281 million and $285 million.)
6	Harry Potter and the Deathly Hallows – Part 1 and Part 2	2010–11	$250	
7	The Matrix Reloaded The Matrix Revolutions	2003	$237	(Note: The Matrix Reloaded and The Matrix Revolutions were produced together at a reported cost of $127 million and $110 million respectively for a combined total of $237 million. Some reports put the combined cost of the production at $300 million.)
8	The Twilight Saga: Breaking Dawn – Part 1 and Part 2	2011–12	^{*}$230	(Note: Summit Entertainment projected a total cost of $263 million for both parts, with $127.5 million to be spent on the first part, and the second costing $136.2 million. After tax rebates, Part 1 cost $110 million, and Part 2 cost $120 million.)

^{*}Officially acknowledged figure.

== Most expensive films (adjusted for inflation) ==
The productions listed here have their nominal budgets adjusted for inflation using the United States Consumer Price Index taking the year of release. Charts adjusted for inflation are usually ordered differently, because they are dependent on the inflation measure used and the original budget estimate.

The Soviet War and Peace, released in four parts across 1966 and 1967, is sometimes cited as the most expensive production ever: Soviet claims stating it cost $100 million (estimated at nearly $700 million accounting for inflation forty years after its release) were circulated in the American press during its showing there. However, its financial records reveal it cost slightly more than $9 million (about $60–70 million in today's money). (Note: The $100 million figure, based on Soviet statements, appeared frequently in the U.S. press in 1968, when War and Peace was released in the country. The New York Times reported it was "the most expensive film ever made... Russians say cost $100 million." New York magazine asserted that "what the Russians estimate to be the equivalent of $100 million" was invested in making it. Other, conflicting estimates were issued by the Soviets to news outlets in other countries (see War and Peace (film series) § Budget). Yet, the protocols of the Soviet State Committee for Cinematography from 25 August 1964 record a meeting of the agency's directors in which a final budget of 8.5 million Soviet ruble was approved for the series; it included all expenses to be made, including 2.51 million to cover those of the Soviet Ministry of Defense, which supplied thousands of soldiers as extras and other assistance. According to the producers' financial statements, compiled after the work on the series was completed in August 1967, the total cost of the film came to 8,291,712 Soviet ruble—or $9,213,013 with the 1967 0.9 ruble = $1 exchange rate. It is technically impossible to adjust the ruble for inflation since the Soviet Union did not formally acknowledge it; instead, the USSR would periodically reprice everything from goods to labour to services. Inflation is usually measured in Western free market economies using a price index such as the consumer price index, but no such measure existed in the case of the Soviet Union. However, it is possible to measure the increase in average annual earnings in the Soviet Union and there is typically a strong correlation between average earnings and inflation. In 1965 the average annual wage in the Soviet Union was 1,158 Soviet rubles, and in October 2021 the average monthly salary in Russia was 54,649 Russian rubles (the Russian ruble replaced the Soviet ruble in Russia after the fall of the Soviet Union), amounting to approximately 655,788 rubles per year. This puts salary inflation at over 57,000% (if the 1998 redenomination of the ruble is factored in, but if not then the true inflation level is 1,000 times higher at 57,000,000%). Applying this rate of inflation to the original cost (8,291,712 rubles) of War and Peace would yield an approximate amount of 4.7 billion Russian rubles. At an exchange rate of approximately 74 rubles to the US dollar, this would be equivalent to about US$64 million in 2021, and considerably less than the $700 million figure that is often reported.) Another notable omission is Metropolis, the 1927 German film directed by Fritz Lang, often erroneously reported as having cost $200 million at the value of modern money. Metropolis cost $1.2–1.3 million at the time of its production, which would be about $24 million at 2021 prices, according to the German consumer price index. (Note: Metropolis originally cost 5.1 million or 5.3 million Reichsmarks in 1927, depending on the source, equivalent to $1.2–1.3 million at a conversion rate of US$1 = RM 4.2080. Calculating the effects of inflation is complicated, since Germany has undergone two currency conversions since Metropolis was produced. As part of the Marshall Plan following World War II, the Deutsche Mark replaced the Reichsmark in 1948 to stave off hyperinflation. However, this was not a simple redenomination exercise: while the Deutsche Mark replaced the Reichsmark at an official rate of DM 1 to RM 10, this only applied to the actual currency, with wages, products and services charged at a rate of DM 1 to RM 1 (see Deutsche Mark: Currency reform of June 1948). This was equivalent to introducing 1000% inflation into the old currency before replacing it. As of 1948, Metropolis would have cost RM 6.2 million adjusted for inflation according to the German consumer price index; redenomination would have inflated that to RM 62 million, which would have been equivalent to DM 6.2 million in the new currency. This only applied to West Germany, but following German reunification, the Deutsche Mark later replaced the East German mark and exchanged at parity. The second redenomination occurred in 1999 when Germany converted to the euro, and this time fully adhered to the conventions of a basic redenomination, with all financial assets exchanged at a rate of DM 1.95583 to €1; at this time, Metropolis would have cost DM 29 million, equivalent to €15 million after conversion. At 2021 prices, it would cost about €20 million, equivalent to US$24 million at an exchange rate of €0.846 to the dollar. Often reported as having cost $200 million at the value of modern money, this estimate is clearly in error by a factor of ten; it is most likely that it came about by adjusting the original cost for inflation, converting the German marks to euros, and then converting the euro figure to US dollars. The process probably failed to account for the fact that the original cost was in Reichsmarks and not Deutsche Marks, so must be divided by 10 to get the equivalent Deutsche Mark value. In applying this methodology, the estimate would come down to about $20 million, and more in line with the CPI figure.)

Most expensive films adjusted for inflation
Rank	Title	Year	Cost (est.) (millions)		Refs and notes
Rank	Title	Year	Adjusted	Nominal	Refs and notes
1	Star Wars: The Force Awakens	2015	$727	^{*}$536	
2	Star Wars: The Rise of Skywalker	2019	$617	^{*}$490	
3	Jurassic World Dominion	2022	$604	^{*}$549	
4	Jurassic World: Fallen Kingdom	2018	$596	^{*}$465	
5	Pirates of the Caribbean: On Stranger Tides	2011	$542	^{*}$379	
6	Avengers: Age of Ultron	2015	$496	^{*}$365	
7	Pirates of the Caribbean: At World's End	2007	$466	$300	
8	Deadpool & Wolverine	2024	$458	^{*}$446	
9	Star Wars: The Last Jedi	2017	$451	^{*}$343	
10	Avengers: Endgame	2019	$448	$356	
11	Avengers: Infinity War	2018	$417	$325	
12	Titanic	1997	$401	^{*}$200	
12	Spider-Man 3	2007	$401	^{*}$258	
14	Fast X	2023	$400	^{*}$379	
15	Justice League	2017	$394	$300	
16	Doctor Strange in the Multiverse of Madness	2022	$386	^{*}$351	
17	Avatar: The Way of Water	2022	$385	$350	
18	Tangled	2010	$384	$260	
18	Solo: A Star Wars Story	2018	$384	^{*}$300	
20	Harry Potter and the Half-Blood Prince	2009	$375	$250	
21	Indiana Jones and the Dial of Destiny	2023	$372	^{*}$352	
22	John Carter	2012	$370	^{*}$264	
23	Rogue One: A Star Wars Story	2016	$364	^{*}$271	
24	Waterworld	1995	$363	^{*}$172	(Note: After Waterworld ballooned from its initial $100 million budget, people involved in the project estimated the final production cost at around $175–180 million, with Kevin Costner—also a producer on the film—confirming it had cost $172 million. Including distribution and marketing the total cost of producing and releasing the film came to $235 million.)
25	Pirates of the Caribbean: Dead Man's Chest	2006	$359	$225	
26	Avatar	2009	$356	^{*}$237	
27	Batman v Superman: Dawn of Justice	2016	$353	$263	
28	Avatar: Fire and Ash	2025	$350	$350	
29	Ant-Man and the Wasp: Quantumania	2023	$349	^{*}$330	
30	King Kong	2005	$341	$207	
30	Spider-Man 2	2004	$341	$200	
32	Furious 7	2015	$340	$250	
33	The Chronicles of Narnia: Prince Caspian	2008	$336	^{*}$225	
34	X-Men: The Last Stand	2006	$335	$210	
34	Beauty and the Beast	2017	$335	^{*}$255	
36	Spectre	2015	$333	$245	
37	Wild Wild West	1999	$329	$170	
38	The Fate of the Furious	2017	$328	$250	
39	Cleopatra	1963	$327	^{*}$31	(Note: With top tickets set at an all-time high of $5.50,Cleopatra had amassed as much as $20 million in such guarantees from exhibitors even before its premiere. Fox claimed the film had cost in total $44 million, of which $31,115,000 represented the direct negative cost and the rest distribution, print and advertising expenses. (These figures excluded the more than $5 million spent on the production's abortive British shoot in 1960–61, prior to its relocation to Italy.) By 1966 worldwide rentals had reached $38,042,000 including $23.5 million from the United States.)
40	Superman Returns	2006	$326	^{*}$204	
41	The Marvels	2023	$324	^{*}$307	
42	The Dark Knight Rises	2012	$323	$230	
43	The Electric State	2025	$320	$320	
44	The Lion King	2019	$315	$250	
45	The Lone Ranger	2013	$311	^{*}$225	
45	Man of Steel	2013	$311	$225	
47	The Avengers	2012	$309	$220	
47	Captain America: Civil War	2016	$309	$230	
49	Maleficent	2014	$307	$226	
49	Mission: Impossible – Dead Reckoning Part One	2023	$307	$291	
51	Pirates of the Caribbean: Dead Men Tell No Tales	2017	$302	$230	
51	Men in Black 3	2012	$302	^{*}$215	
53	Eternals	2021	$301	^{*}$254	
54	Transformers: Revenge of the Fallen	2009	$300	^{*}$200	
54	2012	2009	$300	^{*}$200	
54	Terminator Salvation	2009	$300	$200	
54	The Hobbit: The Desolation of Smaug	2013	$300	$217	
54	Mission: Impossible – The Final Reckoning	2025	$300	$300	
59	Quantum of Solace	2008	$299	$200	
60	Troy	2004	$298	^{*}$175	
61	Oz the Great and Powerful	2013	$297	^{*}$215	
61	The Chronicles of Narnia: The Lion, the Witch and the Wardrobe	2005	$297	$180	
61	No Time to Die	2021	$297	$250	
64	Toy Story 3	2010	$295	$200	
65	Black Widow	2021	$294	^{*}$248	
66	Battleship	2012	$293	^{*}$209	
66	Terminator 3: Rise of the Machines	2003	$293	$167	(Note: The production budget for Terminator 3 was initially set at $169–170 million, making it the most expensive film ever to be greenlit at the time. Budget statements put the final cost of the film at $187 million (or $167 million excluding the production overhead).)
68	Green Lantern	2011	$286	$200	
68	Cars 2	2011	$286	$200	
70	Transformers: Age of Extinction	2014	$286	$210	
71	Transformers: The Last Knight	2017	$285	^{*}$217	
72	Dawn of the Planet of the Apes	2014	$284	$209	
72	The Hobbit: The Battle of the Five Armies	2014	$284	$209	
74	The Amazing Spider-Man	2012	$280	$200	(Note: The official cost of The Amazing Spider-Man is unknown; however, various estimates put its cost at $200 million, $215 million, $220 million, and $230 million.)
74	The Hobbit: An Unexpected Journey	2012	$280	$200	(Note: A knowledgeable source says the first two installments cost $315 million each, and that's with Jackson deferring his fee. A studio source insists that number is wildly inflated and, with significant production rebates from New Zealand, the cost is closer to $200 million a movie.)
76	The Golden Compass	2007	$279	^{*}$180	
76	Transformers: Dark of the Moon	2011	$279	$195	
76	X-Men: Days of Future Past	2014	$279	$205	
79	Armageddon	1998	$277	$140	
79	Indiana Jones and the Kingdom of the Crystal Skull	2008	$277	$185	
79	The Dark Knight	2008	$277	$185	
82	Iron Man 3	2013	$276	$200	
82	Monsters University	2013	$276	$200	
84	Thor: Love and Thunder	2022	$275	$250	
84	Black Panther: Wakanda Forever	2022	$275	$250	
n/a	Van Helsing	2004	$273	$160	
n/a	The Polar Express	2004	$273	$160	
n/a	The Amazing Spider-Man 2	2014	$272	$200	(Note: The Amazing Spider-Man 2 cost over $200 million, with some sources placing the budget at over $250 million.)
n/a	Exodus: Gods and Kings	2014	$272	$200	
n/a	Evan Almighty	2007	$272	$175	
n/a	Snow White	2025	$272	^{*}$272	
n/a	WALL-E	2008	$269	$180	
n/a	Superman	1978	$269–274	$55	

^{*} Officially acknowledged figure.

== Record-holders ==
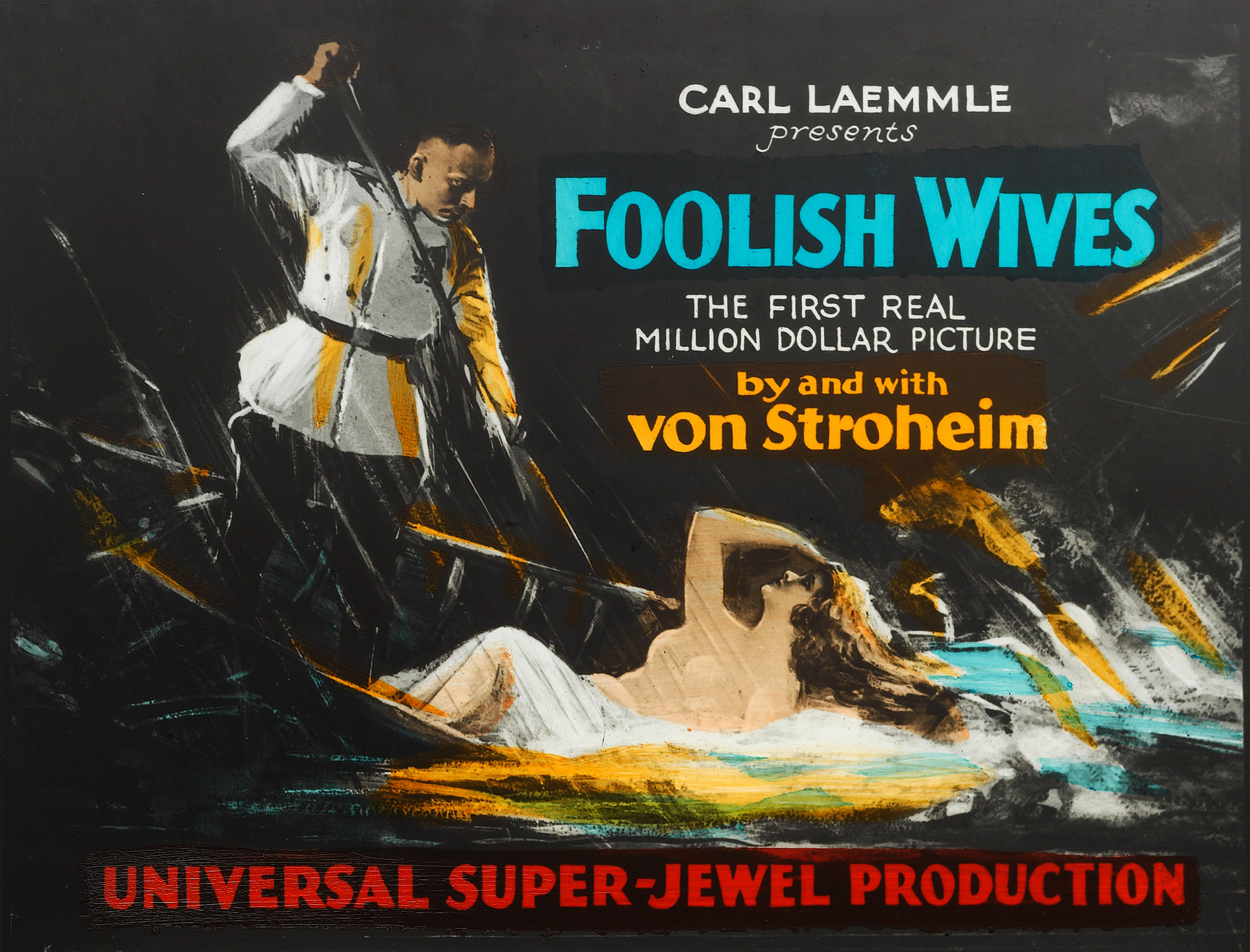
Foolish Wives was the first film to have a $1 million budget.

Throughout the silent era, the cost of film-making grew steadily as films became longer and more ambitious and the techniques and equipment became more sophisticated. It is not known for certain which was the first film to cost $1 million or more to produce, and several myths have grown over time: D. W. Griffith's Intolerance (1916) was reputed to have cost $2 million, but accounts show that it only cost $385,906.77; additionally, A Daughter of the Gods (1916) was advertised as costing a million dollars, but Variety estimated its true cost at $850,000. The first film that is confirmed to have had a $1 million budget is Foolish Wives (1922), with the studio advertising it as "The First Real Million Dollar Picture".

The most expensive film of the silent era was Ben-Hur: A Tale of the Christ (1925), costing about $4 million—twenty-five times the $160,000 average cost of an MGM feature. It is unclear which sound-era production superseded it as the most expensive film, although this is commonly attributed to Hell's Angels (1930), directed by Howard Hughes; the accounts for Hell's Angels show it cost $2.8 million, but Hughes publicised it as costing $4 million, selling it to the media as the most expensive film ever made. The first film to seriously challenge the record was Gone with the Wind, reported to have cost about $3.9–4.25 million, although sources from the time state that Ben-Hur and—erroneously—Hell's Angels cost more. Ben-Hur was definitively displaced at the top of the chart by Duel in the Sun in 1946.

The 1950s saw costs rapidly escalate as cinema competed with television for audiences, culminating with some hugely expensive epics in the 1960s that failed to recoup their costs. A prominent example of this trend was Cleopatra (1963), which lost money on its initial release despite being the highest-grossing film of the year. Since the 1990s, film budgets have once again seen a dramatic increase as the use of computer-generated imagery (CGI) has become commonplace in big-budget features.

Timeline of the most expensive million dollar films
Year	Production	Cost (est.) (millions)	Refs and notes
1922	Foolish Wives	$1.104	
1922	When Knighthood Was in Flower	$1.5	
1923	The Ten Commandments	^{*}$1.476	
1925	Ben-Hur	$3.967	
1939	Gone with the Wind	$3.9–4.25	
1946	Duel in the Sun	$5.255	
1947	Forever Amber	$6.375	
1951	Quo Vadis	$7.623	
1956	The Ten Commandments	^{*}$13.272	
1959	Ben-Hur	$15.175	
1962	Mutiny on the Bounty	$19	
1963	Cleopatra	^{*}$31.115	
1978	Superman	$55	
1988	Rambo III	$58–63	
1988	Who Framed Roger Rabbit	$58.166	(Note: The figure for Who Framed Roger Rabbit includes the production overhead. Amblin Entertainment and Touchstone Pictures placed the actual expenditure on the film itself at around $50 million, but it is not clear if the figures for the other films on the list include or exclude the overhead. Interest payments on the budget came to $17,105,000 which brought the full financial commitment on production to over $75 million.)
1990	Total Recall	$50–60	(Note: 20th Century Fox put the official budget of James Cameron's The Abyss (1989) at $43 million; however, some estimates place the true cost as high as $70 million, which would have made it the most expensive film made up to that point.)
1990	Die Hard 2	$62–70	
1991	Terminator 2: Judgment Day	$94	
1994	True Lies	$100	(Note: Estimates put the budget for True Lies between $100 million and $120 million, but either way it was still the first film to cost over $100 million.)
1995	Waterworld	^{*}$172	
1997	Titanic	^{*}$200	
2005	King Kong	$207	
2006	X-Men: The Last Stand	$210	
2006	Superman Returns	^{*}$204	
2006	Pirates of the Caribbean: Dead Man's Chest	$225	
2007	Spider-Man 3	^{*}$258	
2007	Pirates of the Caribbean: At World's End	$300	
2011	Pirates of the Caribbean: On Stranger Tides	^{*}$379	
2015	Star Wars: The Force Awakens	^{*}$536	
2022	Jurassic World Dominion	^{*}$549	

Timeline of the most expensive back-to-back film productions
Year	Production	Cost (est.) (millions)	Refs and notes
1990	Back to the Future Part II and Part III (1989–1990)	^{†}$80	
2003	The Matrix Reloaded The Matrix Revolutions	^{†}$237	
2003	The Lord of the Rings trilogy (2001–2003)	^{†}^{*}$260	
2007	Pirates of the Caribbean: Dead Man's Chest (2006) Pirates of the Caribbean: At World's End (2007)	^{†}$450	
2014	The Hobbit trilogy (2012–2014)	^{†}^{*}$623	
2019	Avengers: Infinity War (2018) Avengers: Endgame (2019)	^{†}$1,000	

^{*} Officially acknowledged figure.

^{†}The figure given is the cost of a multi-film production, where the films are produced simultaneously.

== See also ==
- Film finance
- List of biggest box-office bombs
- List of highest-grossing films
