= Sales management =

Term in sales business

Sales management is a business discipline which is focused on the practical application of sales techniques and the management of a firm's sales operations. It is an important business function as net sales, through the sale of products and services and resulting profit, drive most commercial business. These are also typically the goals and performance indicators of sales management. Sales manager is the typical title of someone whose role is sales management.

Churchill mentioned that the antecedents of sales performance are based on the meta-analysis for the period 1918- 1982 (76 years of previous research work). He suggested five factors that influence a salesperson's job behaviour and performance along with different categories like skill level, role perceptions, motivation, aptitude, personal factors, and organizational factors with three moderators.

== Sales planning ==
Sales planning involves strategy, setting profit-based sales targets, quotas, sales forecasting, demand management and the execution of a sales plan.

A sales plan is a strategic document that outlines the business targets, resources and sales activities. It typically follows the lead of the marketing plan, strategic planning and the business plan with more specific detail on how the objectives can be achieved through the actual sale of products and services. Sales is a recurring and periodical process (maybe 'daily'), hence, this can not be called as a project. Sales is a process and ideally a periodical activity.

== Recruitment of sales staff ==
The three recruitment tasks used in sales management are job analysis, job description and job qualifications.

Job analysis is performed to specify the tasks that a salesperson is responsible for on a daily basis. It should identify the activities that are vital to the success of the company. This analysis can be conducted by anyone involved in the sales organization or the human resources department, or it may be performed by an outside specialist (Spiro, pp. 134–137). The person responsible for completing the job analysis should have a thorough understanding of the daily activities of the salespeople.

This job analysis is then written in an explicit manner as a job description. The general information consists of:

1. Title of job
2. Organizational relationship
3. Types of products and services sold
4. Types of customers called on
5. Duties and responsibilities related to the job
6. Job demands.

An effective job description will identify compensation plans, size of workload, and the salespeople's duties. It is also primarily responsible for hiring tools such as application forms and psychological tests.

The most difficult part of this process is the determination of job qualifications. A reason for this difficulty is because hiring affects a company's competitive advantage in the market as well as the amount of revenue. Additionally, there should be a set of hiring attributes that is associated with each sales job that is within a company. If an individual does not excel in their assigned territory, it could be due to external factors relating to that person's environment.

A company should be careful not to submit to discrimination in regards to employment. A number of qualifications (ethnic background, age, etc.) can not be used in the selection process of hiring.

== Sales reporting ==
The sales reporting includes the key performance indicators of the sales force. The key performance indicators record whether or not the sales process is being operated effectively and achieving the results as set out in the sales planning. It should enable the sales managers to take timely corrective action deviate from projected values. It also allows senior management to evaluate the sales manager.

More "results related" than "process related" are information regarding the sales funnel and the hit rate.

Sales reporting provides metrics for sales management compensation. Rewarding the best managers without accurate and reliable sales reports is not objective.

Additionally, sales reports are primarily intended for internal use by top management. If the compensation plans of other divisions depend on the final results, it is important to present the sales department's performance to those other departments.

Finally, sales reports are required for investors, partners and government, so the sales management system should have advanced reporting capabilities to satisfy the needs of different stakeholders.

== See also ==
- Economy
- Good (economics)
- Marketing
- Merchandise
- Personal selling
- Promotional mix
- Sales
- Sales operations
- Sales force management
