= TBO =

TBO may refer to:

- TBO (comics), a long-running Spanish comic book magazine
- IATA airport code for Tabora Airport
- Time between overhaul, a measure of an aircraft engine's overall economics
- Total benefits of ownership
- Operation Assistance Force (Tenaga Bantuan Operasi) of Indonesian National Armed Forces
- Toluidine blue O, a purple-staining chemical used clinically and for histology
- TBO.com, a group of travel companies that recently opens their IPO for public.
