= Target income sales =

Target income sales can be computed as the point where Contribution equals Fixed Costs plus Target Income.

In cost accounting, target income sales are the sales necessary to achieve a given target income (or targeted income). It can be measured either in units or in currency (sales proceeds) and can be computed using contribution margin similarly to the break-even point:

$$\begin{align}
&\text{Target Income Sales (in Units)} & &= \frac{\text{Fixed Costs}+\text{Target Income}}{\text{Unit Contribution}}\\
&\text{Target Income Sales (in Sales proceeds)} & &= \frac{\text{Fixed Costs}+\text{Target Income}}{\text{Contribution Margin Ratio}}
\end{align}$$

== See also ==
- Break-even
- Cost–volume–profit analysis
