= Wishing Well Foundation USA =

U.S. non-profit organization

- Formation: 1995
- Founder: Elwin LeBeau, Lisbeth LeBeau (co-founders)
- Tax ID no.: 72-1297795
- Headquarters: 3000 W Esplanade Ave N #100, Metairie, LA 70002
- Key people: Robin Withers (president)
- Revenue: $856,554 (2014)
- Expenses: $887,734 (2014)

Wishing Well Foundation USA is a charity that was founded by husband and wife Elwin and Lisbeth LeBeau in 1995. It seeks to fulfill the wishes of terminally ill children in the United States. The organization has come under criticism in the past for its misleading telemarketer calls and extremely high overhead expenses.

== History ==
Wishing Well Foundation USA was founded by Elwin LeBeau and his wife Lisbeth LeBeau in 1995, after their friend's child died. According to the Charity Navigator website, the foundation was "organized for the purpose of fulfilling the fondest wish for any terminally ill child not expected to reach 18 years of age."

== Controversies ==
=== Administrative and fundraising expenses ===
The foundation has drawn criticism in the past over its use of money raised. As of fiscal year 2014, the most recent year for which data is available, the organization spent 7.2% of its revenue on program expenses, 9.9% on administrative expenses, and 82.7% on fundraising. In comparison, the BBB considers spending more than 35% on total overhead (administrative and fundraising expenses combined) excessive. The Tampa Bay Times ranked Wishing Well Foundation USA #28 on its 2014 list of "America's Worst Charities". When the Tampa Bay Times requested comments from the foundation, the organization claimed, "We have tried in the past to operate without fundraiser assistance, but we could not grant the wishes of the children we wanted to help without fundraiser assistance." In a written message, LeBeau said, "What you are referring to as 'fundraising' also includes several components necessary to the successful operation of the charity, including providing public awareness of the charity's functions so that those in need of its services are able to take advantage of the services offered." The foundation has not filed a voluntary charity report with the BBB.

=== Misleading fundraisers ===
In 1999, the attorney general of Minnesota brought charges against Wishing Well Foundation USA, alleging that the telemarketer calls used for fundraising purposes misled donors into believing that the charity was a well-known organization based in Minnesota. The case was settled out of court for a total of $60,500, of which $22,500 was paid to the state, and $38,000 was paid to establish a fund specifically to benefit children in Minnesota with severe illnesses. Furthermore, the organization was prohibited from soliciting funds in the state until 2004.
