= Total benefits of ownership =

Total benefits of ownership (TBO) is a calculation that tries to summarise the positive effects of the acquisition of a plan. It is an estimate of all the values that will affect a business.

TBO is a financial estimate intended to help buyers and owners determine the direct and indirect benefits of a product or system. It is used to determine potential return on investment (ROI). The usage of TBO may lead to an increase in efficiency and productivity of a business, improvements in decision-making, or improvements in the workforce. It helps to identify important areas which a business should be focusing on, as well as uncovering the hidden aspects of the decisions made by the firm.

== Use of concept ==
TBO goes beyond the initial purpose or implementation benefit to consider the full benefit of a decision or an asset over its useful life. A TBO analysis often shows there can be a large difference between the short-term benefit to the business and its long-term benefit. This can include

- operational cost savings,
- productivity improvements
- enhancements to a business's ability to compete
- greater employee retention
- increased brand equity
- expanding sales reach

For example, a small company can now have access to worldwide markets without the costs of travel. The decisions made from TBO analysis help to add monetary profit into the company's account.

== Importance ==
While many companies perform a total cost of ownership (TCO) analysis, TBO is considered to be as important as TCO. TCO aims to minimize the total cost of the business, whereas TBO targets the maximum value of the project. Enterprise decision-makers often use both methods to estimate the actual value of an investment or strategic venture.

When considering a business proposition, the enterprise decision-makers always consider other alternatives while deciding whether the original plan is the best. An advantage of using TBO is that it identifies the value of the short term and the long-term benefits of the propositions. This system helps the company to prioritize the importance of each decision. This analysis not only serves as a tool to reduce cost but also as a way to plan the future of the business, in a more detailed and sophisticated way.

For example, a company is considering whether to invest in a long-term project, such as infrastructure. TBO will consider whether the long-term benefit may outweigh the short-term benefits of opportunity cost; whether the money spent on investment may have a better alternate purpose, e.g. using the budget to improve training schemes for workers.

== Examples of different industries using total benefits of ownership ==
=== Retailing industry with the use of Internet ===
The TBO concept is widely used within the web industry. For example, TBO identifies the benefits of using the Internet in a business. These include the exclusion of fixed cost (i.e. rent), as well as the decreasing cost of online advertisement.

Some of the key elements are incorporated in the benefit of ownership within retailing industry.

- Cheaper transportation cost
- Increase in global demand for products
- Decrease in variable cost ( i.e. cheaper wages)
- Benefits of outsourcing

=== Computer and software industries etc ===
- Software becomes more user-friendly
- Quicker data analysis
- Greater data storage space

== See also ==
- Total cost of ownership (TCO)
- Return on Investment
- Profit
- Productivity
