= Supply chain surplus =

Supply chain surplus is the value addition by supply chain function of an organisation. It is calculated by the following formula:

Supply chain surplus = Revenue generated from a customer - Total cost incurred to produce and deliver the product.

== Definition and Example ==
Supply chain surplus, also known as supply chain profitability, is a common term that represents value addition by supply chain function of an organization. Jonathan Birkin also defines supply chain surplus as "the difference between the revenue generated from the customers and the overall cost across that supply chain." The operational concept of it is 'sharing the profit that remains after subtracting costs incurred in the production and delivery of products or services. Ideally, profit is distributed to supply chain partners via transfer prices.'

For example, a consumer buys a PC from Samsung at $2,500, which indicates the revenue supply chain achieved. All the stages incur costs to ensure the efficient transfer of funds, information, storage of the product and transportation to the final consumer. The difference between revenue from selling the PC and the supply chain cost represents the supply chain surplus or supply chain profitability. Supply chain surplus is the total profit shared by all the stages and intermediaries. The greater the supply chain surplus, the more successful the supply chain. The success of supply chain calculated by its overall surplus not by the profit at each part of stages.

== Formula ==
Supply chain surplus can be calculated by the following formulae:

Supply chain surplus = Revenue generated from a customer - Total cost incurred to produce and deliver the product.

Supply chain surplus = Customer Value - Supply Chain Cost.

These terms were coined by Sunil Chopra, of the Kellogg School of Management and Peter Meindl, of Kepos Capital.

== Maximising surplus ==
Maximising supply chain surplus is an ultimate objective of the supply chain planning. When we look the amount of supply chain surplus, the success of that supply chain system and its future prospects can be known. To maximise supply chain surplus, every facility that impacts costs must be considered. However, Hugos said that, among those, 'the customer must be the starting point when trying to increase the supply chain surplus because all demand, and therefore revenue, ultimately arises from them.'

=== Traceability and Transparency ===
According to Pagell et al., supply chain surplus is related to sustainability and can be further understood through the practices of traceability and transparency. Traceability is 'the practice of sharing information among supply chain partners about materials that meet industry standards for minimising environmental risk', and Transparency is 'the flow of money through the entire supply chain with an explicit goal of ensuring that each organisation makes enough of a profit to do more than just subsist'. In essence, traceability is concerned with how things are made throughout the chain while transparency is concerned with keeping profits flowing through the entire chain. To maximise surplus, it is important to ensure continuity of the supply chain system by letting each partner in the chain reinvest, innovate, and grow.

=== Outsourcing ===
By aggregating capacity, inventory, inbound or outbound transportation, warehousing, procurement, information, receivables to higher level, outsourcing to a third party can provide a sustainable growth of the surplus to the firm. Sometimes, a growth in surplus may also occur due to lower cost, higher quality, specialization or learning of the third party. A firm gains most from outsourcing to a third party if needs are small, uncertainty is high and other firms are also sourcing from the same third party.

=== Tax efficient management ===
To maximise supply chain surplus, the effect of tax in the design and implementation of supply chain management is also considered. As the result of globalization, now there are so many cross-national businesses. As different countries have different tax rates, companies may legally optimise their supply chain and increase profits based on tax efficiency.

== See also ==
- Supply chain
- Supply chain management
- Supply chain management software
- Supply chain network
- Supply-chain operations reference
- Supply chain optimization
- Supply chain risk management
- Supply chain security
- Supply management
- Supply network
