= Leverage (finance) =

Use of borrowed funds in the purchase of an asset

In finance, leverage, also known as gearing, is any technique involving borrowing funds to buy an investment.

Financial leverage is named after a lever in physics, which amplifies a small input force into a greater output force. Financial leverage uses borrowed money to augment the available capital, thus increasing the funds available for (perhaps risky) investment. If successful this may generate large amounts of profit. However, if unsuccessful, there is a risk of not being able to pay back the borrowed money. Normally, a lender will set a limit on how much risk it is prepared to take, and will set a limit on how much leverage it will permit. It would often require the acquired asset to be provided as collateral security for the loan.

Leverage can arise in a number of situations. Securities like options and futures are effectively leveraged bets between parties where the principal is implicitly borrowed and lent at interest rates of very short treasury bills. Equity owners of businesses leverage their investment by having the business borrow a portion of its needed financing. The more it borrows, the less equity it needs, so any profits or losses are shared among a smaller base and are proportionately larger as a result. Businesses leverage their operations by using fixed cost inputs when revenues are expected to be variable. An increase in revenue will result in a larger increase in operating profit. Hedge funds may leverage their assets by financing a portion of their portfolios with the cash proceeds from the short sale of other positions. In more recent years exchange-traded fund products providing leverged exposure to equities, commodities, currencies, and Alternative finance instruments have been launched by companies including Direxion and ProShares.

== History ==
Before the 1980s, quantitative limits on bank leverage were rare. Banks in most countries had a reserve requirement, a fraction of deposits that was required to be held in liquid form, generally precious metals or government notes or deposits. This does not limit leverage. A capital requirement is a fraction of assets that is required to be funded in the form of equity or equity-like securities. Although these two are often confused, they are in fact opposite. A reserve requirement is a fraction of certain liabilities (from the right hand side of the balance sheet) that must be held as a certain kind of asset (from the left hand side of the balance sheet). A capital requirement is a fraction of assets (from the left hand side of the balance sheet) that must be held as a certain kind of liability or equity (from the right hand side of the balance sheet). Before the 1980s, regulators typically imposed judgmental capital requirements, a bank was supposed to be "adequately capitalized," but these were not objective rules.

National regulators began imposing formal capital requirements in the 1980s, and by 1988 most large multinational banks were held to the Basel I standard. Basel I categorized assets into five risk buckets, and mandated minimum capital requirements for each. This limits accounting leverage. If a bank is required to hold 8% capital against an asset, that is the same as an accounting leverage limit of 1/.08 or 12.5 to 1.

While Basel I is generally credited with improving bank risk management, it suffered from two main defects. It did not require capital for all off-balance sheet risks (there was a clumsy provisions for derivatives, but not for certain other off-balance sheet exposures) and it encouraged banks to pick the riskiest assets in each bucket (for example, the capital requirement was the same for all corporate loans, whether to solid companies or ones near bankruptcy, and the requirement for government loans was zero).

Work on Basel II began in the early 1990s and it was implemented in stages beginning in 2005. Basel II attempted to limit economic leverage rather than accounting leverage. It required advanced banks to estimate the risk of their positions and allocate capital accordingly. While this is much more rational in theory, it is more subject to estimation error, both honest and opportunitistic. The poor performance of many banks during the Subprime mortgage crisis led to calls to reimpose leverage limits, by which most people meant accounting leverage limits, if they understood the distinction at all. However, in view of the problems with Basel I, it seems likely that some hybrid of accounting and notional leverage will be used, and the leverage limits will be imposed in addition to, not instead of, Basel II economic leverage limits.

=== 2008 financial crisis ===
The 2008 financial crisis, like many previous financial crises, was blamed in part on excessive leverage. Consumers in the United States and many other countries had high levels of debt relative to their wages and the value of collateral assets. When home prices fell, and debt interest rates reset higher, and business laid off employees, borrowers could no longer afford debt payments, and lenders could not recover their principal by selling collateral. Financial institutions were highly levered. Lehman Brothers, for example, in its last annual financial statements, showed accounting leverage of 31.4 times ($691 billion in assets divided by $22 billion in stockholders' equity). Bankruptcy examiner Anton R. Valukas determined that the true accounting leverage was higher: it had been understated due to dubious accounting treatments including the so-called repo 105 (allowed by Ernst & Young). Banks' notional leverage was more than twice as high, due to off-balance sheet transactions. At the end of 2007, Lehman had $738 billion of notional derivatives in addition to the assets above, plus significant off-balance sheet exposures to special purpose entities, structured investment vehicles and conduits, plus various lending commitments, contractual payments and contingent obligations. On the other hand, almost half of Lehman's balance sheet consisted of closely offsetting positions and very-low-risk assets, such as regulatory deposits. The company emphasized "net leverage", which excluded these assets. On that basis, Lehman held $373 billion of "net assets" and a "net leverage ratio" of 16.1.

== Risk ==
While leverage magnifies profits when the returns from the asset more than offset the costs of borrowing, leverage may also magnify losses. A corporation that borrows too much money might face bankruptcy or default during a business downturn, while a less-leveraged corporation might survive. An investor who buys a stock on 50% margin will lose 40% if the stock declines 20%; also in this case the involved subject might be unable to refund the incurred significant total loss.

Risk may depend on the volatility in value of collateral assets. Brokers may demand additional funds when the value of securities held declines. Banks may decline to renew mortgages when the value of real estate declines below the debt's principal. Even if cash flows and profits are sufficient to maintain the ongoing borrowing costs, loans may be called-in.

This may happen exactly at a time when there is little market liquidity, i.e. a paucity of buyers, and sales by others are depressing prices. It means that as market price falls, leverage goes up in relation to the revised equity value, multiplying losses as prices continue to go down. This can lead to rapid ruin, for even if the underlying asset value decline is mild or temporary the debt-financing may be only short-term, and thus due for immediate repayment. The risk can be mitigated by negotiating the terms of leverage, by maintaining unused capacity for additional borrowing, and by leveraging only liquid assets which may rapidly be converted to cash.

There is an implicit assumption in that account, however, which is that the underlying leveraged asset is the same as the unleveraged one. If a company borrows money to modernize, add to its product line or expand internationally, the extra trading profit from the additional diversification might more than offset the additional risk from leverage. Or if an investor uses a fraction of his or her portfolio to margin stock index futures (high risk) and puts the rest in a low-risk money-market fund, he or she might have the same volatility and expected return as an investor in an unlevered low-risk equity-index fund. Or if both long and short positions are held by a pairs-trading stock strategy the matching and off-setting economic leverage may lower overall risk levels.

So while adding leverage to a given asset always adds risk, it is not the case that a levered company or investment is always riskier than an unlevered one. In fact, many highly levered hedge funds have less return volatility than unlevered bond funds, and normally heavily indebted low-risk public utilities are usually less risky stocks than unlevered high-risk technology companies.

== Definitions ==
The term leverage is used differently in investments and corporate finance, and has multiple definitions in each field.

=== Accounting leverage ===
Accounting leverage is total assets divided by the total assets minus total liabilities.

=== Banking ===
Under Basel III, banks are expected to maintain a leverage ratio in excess of 3%. The ratio is defined as

$$\frac{\mbox{Tier 1 Capital}}{\mbox{Total exposure}}$$.

Here the exposure is defined broadly and includes off-balance sheet items and derivative "add-ons", whereas Tier 1 capital is limited to the banks "core capital". See Basel III § Leverage ratio

=== Notional leverage ===
Notional leverage is total notional amount of assets plus total notional amount of liabilities divided by equity.

=== Economic leverage ===
Economic leverage is volatility of equity divided by volatility of an unlevered investment in the same assets. For example, assume a party buys $100 of a 10-year fixed-rate treasury bond and enters into a fixed-for-floating 10-year interest rate swap to convert the payments to floating rate. The derivative is off-balance sheet, so it is ignored for accounting leverage. Accounting leverage is therefore 1 to 1. The notional amount of the swap does count for notional leverage, so notional leverage is 2 to 1. The swap removes most of the economic risk of the treasury bond, so economic leverage is near zero.

=== Corporate finance ===
$$\text{Degree of Operating Leverage} = \frac{\mathrm{EBIT\;+\;Fixed\;Costs}}{\mathrm{EBIT}}$$

$$\text{Degree of Financial Leverage} = \frac{\mathrm{EBIT}}{\mathrm{EBIT} -
\text{Total Interest Expense}}$$

$$\text{Degree of Combined Leverage} = \text{DOL} \times \text{DFL} = \frac{\mathrm{EBIT} + \text{Fixed Costs}}{\mathrm{EBIT} - \text{Total Interest Expense}}$$

There are several ways to define operating leverage, the most common. is:

$$\begin{align}
\text{Operating leverage} & = \frac{\text{Revenue} - \text{Variable Cost}}{\text{Revenue} - \text{Variable Cost} - \text{Fixed Cost}} = \frac{\text{Revenue} - \text{Variable Cost}}{\text{Operating Income}}
\end{align}$$

Financial leverage is usually defined as:

$$\text{Financial leverage}= \frac{\text{Total Debt}}{\text{Shareholders' Equity}}$$

For outsiders, it is hard to calculate operating leverage as fixed and variable costs are usually not disclosed. In an attempt to estimate operating leverage, one can use the percentage change in operating income for a one-percent change in revenue. The product of the two is called total leverage, and estimates the percentage change in net income for a one-percent change in revenue.

There are several variants of each of these definitions, and the financial statements are usually adjusted before the values are computed. Moreover, there are industry-specific conventions that differ somewhat from the treatment above.

== See also ==
- Coupon leverage
- Homemade leverage
- Leveraged buyout
- Margin (finance)
- Operating leverage
- Repurchase agreement
