= Pre-determined overhead rate =

Rate used to apply manufacturing overhead to work-in-process inventory

Formula for calculating the Pre-determined Overhead Rate

A pre-determined overhead rate is the rate used to apply manufacturing overhead to work-in-process inventory. The pre-determined overhead rate is calculated before the period begins. The first step is to estimate the amount of the activity base that will be required to support operations in the upcoming period. The second step is to estimate the total manufacturing cost at that level of activity. The third step is to compute the predetermined overhead rate by dividing the estimated total manufacturing overhead costs by the estimated total amount of cost driver or activity base. Common activity bases used in the calculation include direct labor costs, direct labor hours, or machine hours.

This is related to an activity rate which is a similar calculation used in activity-based costing. A pre-determined overhead rate is normally the term when using a single, plant-wide base to calculate and apply overhead. Overhead is then applied by multiplying the pre-determined overhead rate by the actual driver units. Any difference between applied overhead and the amount of overhead actually incurred is called over- or under-applied overhead.

== Need ==
Instead of using a pre-determined rate based on estimates, businesses can base the overhead rate on the actual total manufacturing overhead cost and the actual total amount of the activity base incurred on a monthly, quarterly, or annual basis. If an actual rate is computed monthly or quarterly, seasonal factors in overhead costs or in the activity base can produce fluctuations in the overhead rate. For example, the costs of heating and cooling a factory in Illinois will be highest in the winter and summer months and lowest in the spring and fall. If the overhead rate is recomputed at the end of each month or each quarter based on actual costs and activity, the overhead rate would go up in the winter and summer and down in the spring and fall. As a result, two identical jobs, one completed in the winter and one completed in the spring, would be assigned different manufacturing overhead costs. Many managers believe that such fluctuations in product costs serve no useful purpose. To avoid such fluctuations, actual overhead rates could be computed on an annual or less-frequent basis. However, if the overhead rate is computed annually based on the actual costs and activity for the year, the manufacturing overhead assigned to any particular job would not be known until the end of the year. For example, the cost of Job 2B47 at Yost Precision Machining would not be known until the end of the year, even though the job will be completed and shipped to the customer in March. For these reasons, most companies use predetermined overhead rates rather than actual overhead rates in their cost accounting systems.

The use of such a rate enables an enterprise to determine the approximate total cost of each job when completed. In recent years increased automation in manufacturing operations has resulted in a trend towards machine hours as the activity base in the calculation.

== Determining ==
To find the overhead rate, first determine the right basis that will describe the best the behavior of the cost. Then, divide the total budgeted overhead by the basis to calculate the overhead rate:

$$Overhead Rate = (Total Budgeted Overhead / Basis)$$

=== Basis ===
There are many ways that can be used to determine the right basis for a given order. These bases are:

- Direct Labor Cost: this basis is used when manufacturing is labor-intensive.
- Direct Labor Hours: it is used When workers are paid on the basis of their working hours.
- Prime Cost: the prime cost is used when the factory produces only one kind of product.
- Machine time: this basis is used when manufacturing is mostly automated.

=== Calculation ===
In order to find the overhead rate we will use the same basis that we have chosen by multiplying this basis by the calculated rate. For example, if we choose the labor hours to be the basis then we will multiply the rate by the direct labor hours in each task during the manufacturing process.

$$The Share Of The Order Of The Overhead = Overhead Rate * Resources Consumed$$
