= Homemade leverage =

In finance, homemade leverage is the use of personal borrowing of investors to change the amount of financial leverage of the firm. Investors can use homemade leverage to change an unleveraged firm into a leveraged firm.

According to the Corporate Finance Institute, "the founding philosophy of homemade leverage is the Modigliani–Miller theorem, which assumes an efficient market and the absence of corporate taxes and bankruptcy costs."

Investors take this concept and use it to “recreate a leverage scenario using a portion of their investments. The argument works under the assumption that corporate taxes and bankruptcy costs are absent, which would otherwise disrupt an investor’s ability to produce the leverage scenario accurately.”

== See also ==
- Leverage
- Modigliani–Miller theorem
