= Operating room management =

Managing an operating room suite

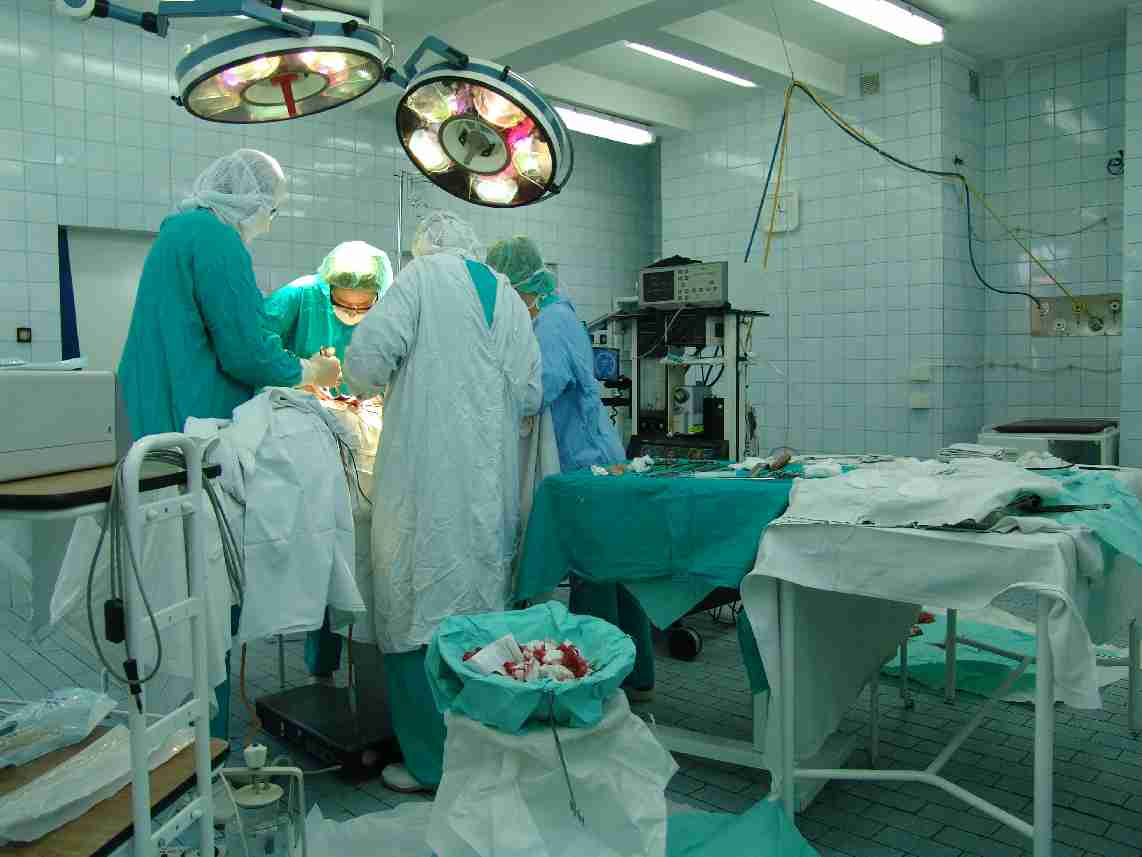
An operating theatre (gynecological hospital of Medical University of SilesiaBytom)

Operating room management is the science of how to run an operating room suite. Operational operating room management focuses on maximizing operational efficiency at the facility, i.e. maximizing the number of surgical cases that can be carried out on a given day while minimizing the required resources and related costs. This may include establishing the number of anaesthetists or scrub nurses required to accommodate the expected workload, or minimizing the cost of drugs used in the Operating room. Strategic operating room management deals with long-term decision-making.
