= Break-even point =

Equality of costs and revenues

The break-even point

The break-even point (BEP) in economics, business—and specifically cost accounting—is the point at which total cost and total revenue are equal, i.e. "even". In layperson's terms, after all costs are paid for there is neither profit nor loss. In economics specifically, the term has a broader definition; even if there is no net loss or gain, and one has "broken even", opportunity costs have been covered and capital has received the risk-adjusted, expected return. The break-even analysis was developed by Karl Bücher and Johann Friedrich Schär.

== Overview ==
The break-even point (BEP) or break-even level represents the sales amount—in either unit (quantity) or revenue (sales) terms—that is required to cover total costs, consisting of both fixed and variable costs to the company. Total profit at the break-even point is zero. It is only possible for a firm to pass the break-even point if the dollar value of sales is higher than the variable cost per unit. This means that the selling price of the goods must be higher than what the company paid for the good or its components for them to cover the initial price they paid (variable and fixed costs). Once they surpass the break-even price, the company can start making a profit.

The break-even point is one of the most commonly used concepts of financial analysis, and is not only limited to economic use, but can also be used by entrepreneurs, accountants, financial planners, managers and even marketers. Break-even points can be useful to all avenues of a business, as it allows employees to identify required outputs and work towards meeting these.

The break-even value is not a generic value as such and will vary dependent on the individual business. Some businesses may have a higher or lower break-even point. However, it is important that each business develop a break-even point calculation, as this will enable them to see the number of units they need to sell to cover their variable costs. Each sale will also make a contribution to the payment of fixed costs as well.

For example, a business that sells tables needs to make annual sales of 200 tables to break-even. At present the company is selling fewer than 200 tables and is therefore operating at a loss. As a business, they must consider increasing the number of tables they sell annually in order to make enough money to pay fixed and variable costs.

If the business does not think that they can sell the required number of units, they could consider the following options:

1. Reduce the fixed costs. This could be done through a number or negotiations, such as reductions in rent payments, or through better management of bills or other costs.

2. Reduce the variable costs, (which could be done by finding a new supplier that sells tables for less).

Either option can reduce the break-even point so the business need not sell as many tables as before, and could still pay fixed costs.

== Purpose ==
The main purpose of break-even analysis is to determine the minimum output that must be exceeded for a business to profit. It also is a rough indicator of the earnings impact of a marketing activity. A firm can analyze ideal output levels to be knowledgeable on the amount of sales and revenue that would meet and surpass the break-even point. If a business doesn't meet this level, it often becomes difficult to continue operation.

The break-even point is one of the simplest, yet least-used analytical tools. Identifying a break-even point helps provide a dynamic view of the relationships between sales, costs, and profits. For example, expressing break-even sales as a percentage of actual sales can help managers understand when to expect to break even (by linking the percent to when in the week or month this percent of sales might occur).

The break-even point is a special case of Target Income Sales, where Target Income is 0 (breaking even). This is very important for financial analysis. Any sales made past the breakeven point can be considered profit (after all initial costs have been paid)

Break-even analysis can also provide data that can be useful to the marketing department of a business as well, as it provides financial goals that the business can pass on to marketers so they can try to increase sales.

Break-even analysis can also help businesses see where they could re-structure or cut costs for optimum results. This may help the business become more effective and achieve higher returns. In many cases, if an entrepreneurial venture is seeking to get off of the ground and enter into a market it is advised that they formulate a break-even analysis to suggest to potential financial backers that the business has the potential to be viable and at what points.

== Construction ==
In the linear Cost-Volume-Profit Analysis model (where marginal costs and marginal revenues are constant, among other assumptions), the break-even point (BEP) (in terms of Unit Sales (X)) can be directly computed in terms of Total Revenue (TR) and Total Costs (TC) as:

$$\begin{align}
\text{TR} &=  \text{TC}\\
P\times X &= \text{TFC} + V \times X\\
P\times X - V \times X &= \text{TFC}\\
\left(P - V\right)\times X &= \text{TFC}\\
X &= \frac{\text{TFC}}{P - V}
\end{align}$$

where:

- TFC is Total Fixed Costs,
- P is Unit Sale Price, and
- V is Unit Variable Cost.

The break-even point can alternatively be computed as the point where Contribution equals Fixed Costs.

The quantity, $\left(P - V\right)$, is of interest in its own right, and is called the Unit Contribution Margin (C): it is the marginal profit per unit, or alternatively the portion of each sale that contributes to Fixed Costs. Thus the break-even point can be more simply computed as the point where Total Contribution = Total Fixed Cost:

$$\begin{align}
\text{Total Contribution} &=  \text{Total Fixed Costs}\\
\text{Unit Contribution}\times \text{Number of Units} &= \text{Total Fixed Costs}\\
\text{Number of Units} &= \frac{\text{Total Fixed Costs}}{\text{Unit Contribution}}
\end{align}$$

To calculate the break-even point in terms of revenue (a.k.a. currency units, a.k.a. sales proceeds) instead of Unit Sales (X), the above calculation can be multiplied by Price, or, equivalently, the Contribution Margin Ratio (Unit Contribution Margin over Price) can be calculated:

$$\text{Break-even(in Sales)}  = \frac{\text{Fixed Costs}}{C/P}.$$

R=C,

Where R is revenue generated, C is cost incurred i.e. Fixed costs + Variable Costs or

$$\begin{align}
Q \times P &= \mathrm{TFC} + Q \times VC &\text{(Price per unit)}\\
Q \times P - Q \times \mathrm{VC} &= \mathrm{TFC}\\
Q \times (P - \mathrm{VC}) &= \mathrm{TFC}\\
\end{align}$$

or, Break Even Analysis

Q = TFC/c/s ratio = Break Even

=== Margin of safety ===
Margin of safety represents the strength of the business. It enables a business to know what is the exact amount it has gained or lost and whether they are over or below the break-even point. In break-even analysis, margin of safety is the extent by which actual or projected sales exceed the break-even sales.

Margin of safety = (current output - breakeven output)

Margin of safety% = (current output - breakeven output)/current output × 100

When dealing with budgets you would instead replace "Current output" with "Budgeted output." If P/V ratio is given then profit/PV ratio.

=== Break-even analysis ===
By inserting different prices into the formula, you will obtain a number of break-even points, one for each possible price charged. If the firm changes the selling price for its product, from $2 to $2.30, in the example above, then it would have to sell only 1000/(2.3 - 0.6)= 589 units to break even, rather than 715.

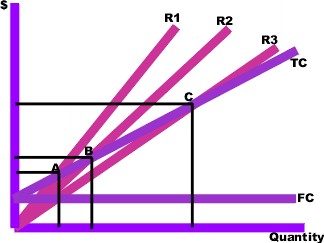

To make the results clearer, they can be graphed. To do this, draw the total cost curve (TC in the diagram), which shows the total cost associated with each possible level of output, the fixed cost curve (FC) which shows the costs that do not vary with output level, and finally the various total revenue lines (R1, R2, and R3), which show the total amount of revenue received at each output level, given the price you will be charging.

The break-even points (A, B, C) are the points of intersection between the total cost curve (TC) and a total revenue curve (R1, R2, or R3). The break-even quantity at each selling price can be read off the horizontal axis and the break-even price at each selling price can be read off the vertical axis. The total cost, total revenue, and fixed cost curves can each be constructed with simple formula. For example, the total revenue curve is simply the product of selling price times quantity for each output quantity. The data used in these formula come either from accounting records or from various estimation techniques such as regression analysis.

== Limitations ==
- The Break-even analysis is only a supply-side (i.e., costs only) analysis, as it tells you nothing about what sales are actually likely to be for the product at these various prices.
- It assumes that fixed costs (FC) are constant. Although this is true in the short run, an increase in the scale of production is likely to cause fixed costs to rise.
- It assumes average variable costs are constant per unit of output, at least in the range of likely quantities of sales. (i.e., linearity).
- It assumes that the quantity of goods produced is equal to the quantity of goods sold (i.e., there is no change in the quantity of goods held in inventory at the beginning of the period and the quantity of goods held in inventory at the end of the period).
- In multi-product companies, it assumes that the relative proportions of each product sold and produced are constant (i.e., the sales mix is constant).

== See also ==
- Cost-plus pricing
- Pricing
- Contribution margin
