= Efficiency ratio =

The efficiency ratio indicates the expenses as a percentage of revenue (expenses / revenue), with a few variations – it is essentially how much a corporation or individual spends to make a dollar; entities are supposed to attempt minimizing efficiency ratios (reducing expenses and increasing earnings). The concept typically applies to banks. It relates to operating leverage, which measures the ratio between fixed costs and variable costs.

Efficiency means the extent to which cash is generated over time and relative to other enterprises. Efficiency ratios for a given year may therefore be used to determine whether an enterprise has generated enough cash in relation to other years and in relation to other institutions (Koen and Oberholster, 1999). For measuring efficiency can be used receivable collection period ratio.

== Formula ==
Efficiency = input/ output

If expenses are $60 and revenue is $80 (perhaps net of interest revenue/expense) the efficiency ratio is 0.75 or 75% (60/80) – meaning that $0.75 are spent for every dollar earned in revenue.

=== An example ===
Citigroup, Inc. (2003):

- Revenues, net of interest expense: 77,442
- Operating expenses: 39,168

That makes the efficiency ratio = 39,168/77,442 = 0.51 or 51%.

If "benefits, claims, and credit losses", for 11,941, are added to operating expenses, the efficiency ratio worsens to 51,109/77,442 = 0.66

== See also ==
- Business margin
- Financial market efficiency
- Operating leverage
- Sortino ratio
- Business process reengineering
- Cost–benefit ratio
