= Semi-variable cost =

In business and accounting, a semi-variable cost (also referred to as a mixed or semi-fixed cost) is an expense which contains both a fixed cost component and a variable cost component. It is often used to project financial performance at different scales of production. It is related to the scale of production within a business where there is a fixed cost which remains constant across all scales of production while the variable cost increases proportionally to production levels.

Using a factory as an example, fixed costs can include the leasing of the factory building and insurance, while the variable costs include overtime pay and the purchase price of the raw materials.

== Calculating semi-variable costs ==
=== Linear costs ===
In the simplest case, where cost is linear in output, the equation for the total semi-variable cost is as follows:

$$Y = a + bX$$

where $Y$ is the total cost, $a$ is the fixed cost, $b$ is the variable cost per unit, and $X$ is the number of units (i.e. the output produced).

==== Example with linear costs ====
A factory costs £5000 per week to produce goods at a minimum level and due to high demand it has to produce for an extra 20 hours in the week. Including the wages, utility bills, raw materials etc. the extra cost per hour (the variable cost) is £300. In this example, the weekly fixed cost ($a$) is £5000, the variable cost ($b$) is £300 per hour, and the output ($X$) is 20 hours. To find the total cost $Y$, we calculate:

$$Y = a + bX = 5,000+300*20=11,000$$

The total cost would be £11,000 to run the factory for this particular week.

=== The high-low method ===
If the variable part of the cost is not linear, calculating an estimate can be more difficult. The high-low method is a relatively common method used by managers and accountants alike to estimate the variable costs as if they were linear. By identifying the time periods when production is at its highest and its lowest, and inputting the figures into the high-low equation, we can separate out the variable and fixed costs.

To find the variable cost $b$ per unit:

$$b=(Y_1-Y_2)/(X_1-X_2)$$

where $Y_1$ is the total variable cost at the high end of activity, $Y_2$ is the cost at the low end of activity, $X_1$ is the number of units at the high end, and $X_2$ is the number of units at the low end.

==== Example with the high-low method ====
A factory's costs are £10,600 during the busiest week, and £8,500 during the quietest week. The fixed cost is known to be £5,000, so the variable cost during the busy week ($Y_1$) is £5,600, and during the quiet week ($Y_2$) is £3,500. The factory was running for 70 hours during the busiest week ($X_1$) and 40 hours during the quietest week ($X_2$). To estimate the variable cost per hour, we calculate:

$$b=(5,600-3,500)/(70-40) = 2,100/30 = 70$$

So the estimated variable cost is £70 per hour. This estimate can now be used with the linear formula from before; if the factory is going to run for 60 hours in the coming week, the total cost $Y$ can be calculated:
$$Y=a+bX=5,000+70*60=9,200$$
So the predicted total cost for the week would be £9,200.

==== Advantages and disadvantages ====
A major advantage of the high-low method is that it is relatively simple to calculate. This enables an estimate for the fixed costs and variable costs to be found in a short time, with only basic mathematics and no expensive programs to run the calculations, allowing for the firm to invest its finite resources elsewhere. This is particularly useful for smaller businesses who cannot afford more qualified accountants.

As this particular method only uses the highest and lowest figures it means that individuals in companies can simply research the data in the company database to find out the total costs and scale of production. This would allow the business to calculate the component parts of its semi-variable costs quite easily, leading to a better understanding of how the company performs and its expenses.

However, the high-low method can only produce an estimate. As it only uses two sets of data, the highest and lowest, it can be largely unreliable as often firms can have high variances in production levels and this method would not be able to capture the average activity levels. There are more accurate methods such as the least-squares regression, although this is much more complex to use.

Another major drawback of the high-low method is that only one variable is taken into account. For example, if the variable cost is measured by time (e.g. per hour), but the firm wants to produce at a higher level than it ever has before, expansions costs (such are buying more equipment, hiring more people, etc.) will not be taken into account. The disadvantage of calculating semi-variable costs through this particular method is that it would underestimate the cost as it does not separate the fixed and variable costs, leading to the increase in expenditure being neglected and resulting in incorrect forecasts. This could lead to the firm's bottom line eroding as the individual would estimate lower costs than what it would occur and profits would be lower than expected.
