= Total cost of acquisition =

Total cost required by any company for managerial tasks

Total cost of acquisition (TCA) is a managerial accounting concept that includes all the costs associated with buying goods, services, or assets.

Generally, it is the net price plus other costs needed to purchase the item and get it to the point of use. These other costs can include: the item's purchasing costs (closing, research, accounting, commissions, legal fees), transportation, preparation and installation costs.

Typically they do not include training, system integration costs that might be considered operational costs.

== See also ==
- Total cost
- Total cost of ownership
- Procurement
- Purchase § Acquisition process
