= Variable cost =

Sum of marginal costs over all units produced

Total Costs disaggregated as Fixed Costs plus Variable Costs. The quantity of output is measured on the horizontal axis.

Variable costs are costs that change as the quantity of the good or service that a business produces changes. Variable costs are the sum of marginal costs over all units produced. They can also be considered normal costs. Fixed costs and variable costs make up the two components of total cost. Direct costs are costs that can easily be associated with a particular cost object. However, not all variable costs are direct costs. For example, variable manufacturing overhead costs are variable costs that are indirect costs, not direct costs. Variable costs are sometimes called unit-level costs as they vary with the number of units produced.

Some writers also refer to "mixed costs" or semi-variable costs, which are partially fixed and partially variable, such as electricity costs with a standing charge (fixed) and a charge based on usage (variable).

Direct labor and overhead are often called conversion cost, while direct material and direct labor are often referred to as prime cost.

In marketing, it is necessary to know how costs divide between variable and fixed. This distinction is crucial in forecasting the earnings generated by various changes in unit sales and thus the financial impact of proposed marketing campaigns. In a survey of nearly 200 senior marketing managers, 60 percent responded that they found the "variable and fixed costs" metric very useful.

The level of variable cost is influenced by many factors, such as fixed cost, duration of project, uncertainty and discount rate. An analytical formula of variable cost as a function of these factors has been derived. It can be used to assess how different factors impact variable cost and total return in an investment.

== Examples ==
Some common examples include sales commission, labor costs, and the costs of raw materials.

For a business which produces clothing, variable cost would include the direct material, i.e., cloth, and the direct labor. If the business uses a room, a sewing machine, and 8 hours of a laborer's time with 6 yards of cloth to make a shirt, then the cost of labor and cloth increases if two shirts are produced, and those are the variable costs. The facility and equipment are fixed costs, incurred regardless of whether even one shirt is made.

	0 shirts	1 shirt	2 shirts	3 shirts
Cloth (Direct Materials)	0yds	6yds	12yds	18yds
Labor (Direct Labor)	0hrs	8hrs	16hrs	24hrs
Equipment	1 machine	1 machine	1 machine	1 machine
Facility (overhead)	1 room	1 room	1 room	1 room

The amount of materials and labor that goes into each shirt increases with the number of shirts produced. In this sense, the cost "varies" as production varies. In the long run, if the business planned to make 0 shirts, it would choose to have 0 machines and 0 rooms, but in the short run, even if it produces no shirts it has incurred those costs. Similarly, even if the total cost of producing 1 shirt is greater than the revenue from selling the shirt, the business would produce the shirt anyway if the revenue were greater than the variable cost. If the revenue that it is receiving is greater than its variable cost but less than its total cost, it will continue to operate while accruing an economic loss. If its total revenue is less than its variable cost in the short run, the business should shut down. If revenue is greater than total cost, this firm will have positive economic profit.

== Variable costs over time ==
Over a one-day horizon, a factory's costs might largely consist of fixed costs, not variable. The company must pay for the building, the employee benefits, and the machinery regardless of whether anything is produced that day. The main variable cost will be materials and any energy costs actually used in production. However, over a six-month horizon, the factory will be better able to change the amount of labor to fit the desired output, either by using overtime hours, laying off employees, or hiring new employees. Thus, much of their labor becomes a variable cost - though not the cost of the managers, whose salaries are paid regardless of output.

Over a five-year horizon, all costs can become variable costs. The business can decide to shut down and sell its buildings and equipment if its long-run total costs exceed its long-run total revenue, or expand and increase the amount of both if its long-run total revenue exceeds its long-run total costs, including its variable costs. It can also change its entire labor force, including both managerial and line workers.

Thus, whether a cost is classified as variable or fixed depends on the time horizon. These costs are most simply classified into the short run and the long run, although there is, in reality, an entire range of time horizons.

== See also ==
- Cost accounting
- Cost curve
- Cost driver
- Semi variable cost
- Total revenue share
- Contribution margin

== Sources ==
- Garrison, Ray H; Eric W. Noreen; Peter C. Brewer (2009). Managerial Accounting (13e ed.). McGraw-Hill Irwin. ISBN 978-0-07-337961-6.
- Prime Cost Explanation and Examples by Play Accounting.
