= Break-even =

Point of balance at which neither a profit nor a loss is made

Break-even (or break even), often abbreviated as B/E in finance (sometimes called point of equilibrium), is the point of balance making neither a profit nor a loss. It involves a situation when a business makes just enough revenue to cover its total costs. Any number below the break-even point constitutes a loss while any number above it shows a profit. The term originates in finance but the concept has been applied in other fields.

== In economics ==
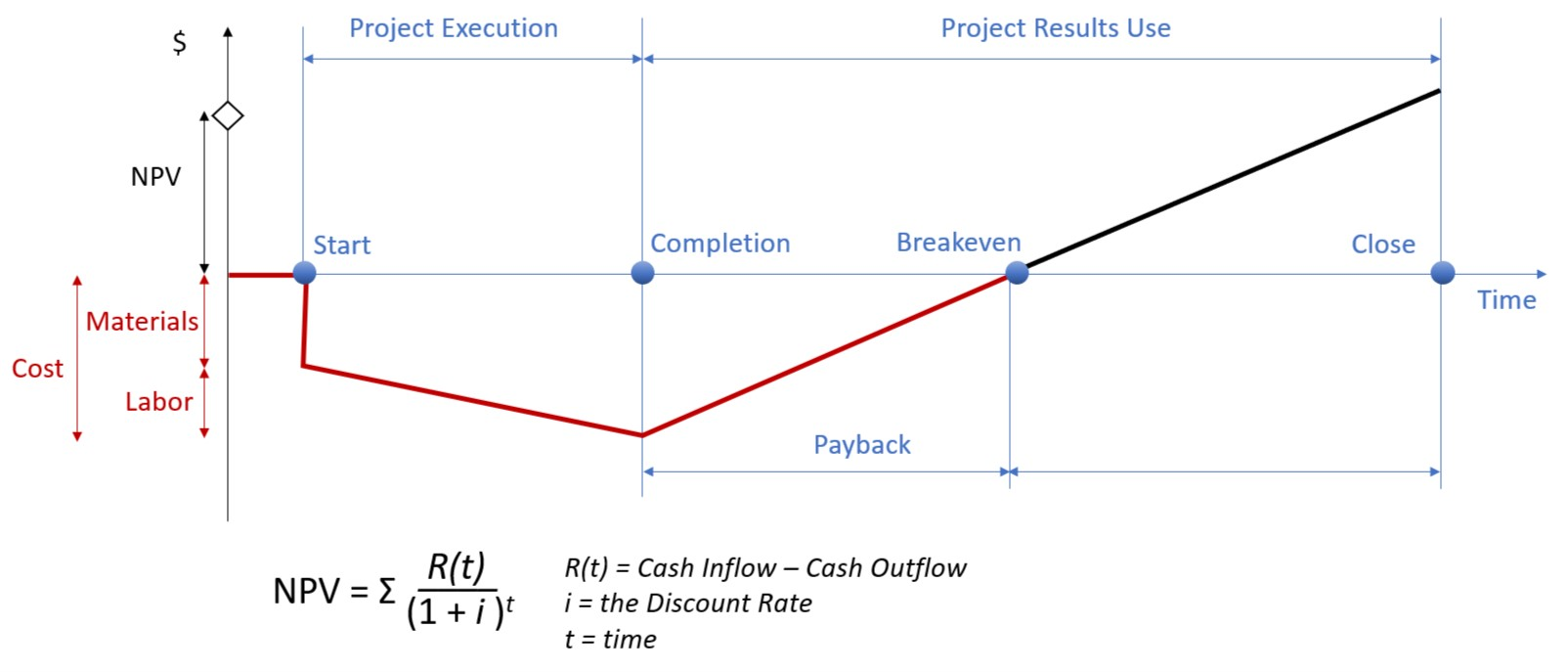
A simplified cash flow model shows the payback period as the time from the project completion to the breakeven.

In economics and business, specifically cost accounting, the break-even point (BEP) is the point at which cost or expenses and revenue are equal: there is no net loss or gain, and one has "broken even". A profit or loss has not been made, although opportunity costs have been "paid" and capital has received the risk-adjusted, expected return. In other words, it is the point at which the total revenue of a business exceeds its total costs, and the business begins to create wealth instead of consuming it. It is shown graphically as the point where the total revenue and total cost curves meet. In the linear case the break-even point is equal to the fixed costs divided by the contribution margin per unit.

The break-even point is achieved when the generated profits match the total costs accumulated up to the date of profit generation. Establishing the break-even point helps businesses set plans for the levels of production they need to maintain to remain profitable.

== In finance ==
The accounting method of calculating break-even point does not include cost of working capital. The financial method of calculating break-even, called value added break-even analysis, is used to assess the feasibility of a project. This method not only accounts for all costs, it also includes the opportunity costs of the capital required to develop a project.

== In other fields ==
In nuclear fusion research, the term break-even refers to a fusion energy gain factor equal to unity; this is also known as the Lawson criterion. The notion can also be found in more general phenomena, such as percolation. In energy, the break-even point is the point at which the usable energy obtained from a process equals the input energy.

In computer science, the term (used infrequently) refers to a point in the life cycle of a programming language where the language can be used to code its own compiler or interpreter. This is also called self-hosting.

In medicine, it is a postulated state when the advances of medicine permit every year an increase of one year or more of the life expectancy of the living, therefore leading to medical immortality, barring accidental death.

In Association football, the break-even requirement was adopted by UEFA. It is known as UEFA Financial Fair Play Regulations. Its purpose is to prohibit clubs from spending more money on transfers than they earn as businesses, i.e. revenue per each fiscal year excluding donations from sponsors or advertisers.
