= Factory overhead =

Factory overhead, also called manufacturing overhead, manufacturing overhead costs (MOH cost), work overhead, or factory burden in American English, is the total cost involved in operating all production facilities of a manufacturing business that cannot be traced directly to a product. It generally applies to indirect labor and indirect cost. Overhead also includes all costs involved in manufacturing with the exception of the cost of raw materials. Examples include supplies, indirect materials such as lubricants, indirect manufacturing labor such as plant maintenance and cleaning labor, plant rent, plant insurance, property taxes on the plant, plant depreciation, and the compensation of plant managers.

== Items of the overhead ==
Manufacturing overhead includes other costs in manufacturing that are neither direct materials costs nor direct labor costs. It might also be referred as the factory burden or production overhead. Its value is essential for determining the cost of products to be manufactured.

This category of costs includes expenses like:

1. Electricity for the equipment and lighting.
2. Cleaning costs of equipment.
3. Material handling like forklifts
4. Maintenance of the equipment.
5. Wages of employees in the factory who for example work on record keeping and inspection of materials.
6. Computing the operation of the process of manufacturing the product.
7. Insurance
8. Safety and quality cost.
9. Plant Repairs
