= Total revenue share =

The total revenue share represents the percentage of revenue allocated to direct costs. This financial metric combines both product costs and marketing costs to provide a comprehensive measure of expenses directly associated with generating revenue.

== Calculation ==
The formula for total revenue share is:

Total Revenue Share = (Direct Costs ÷ Revenue) × 100%

where Direct Costs = Product Costs + Marketing Costs

For example, if a company generates $100,000 in revenue with $40,000 in product costs and $20,000 in marketing costs, the total revenue share equals:

Total Revenue Share = ($60,000 ÷ $100,000) × 100% = 60%

== Business applications ==
Companies use total revenue share to evaluate operational efficiency across different product lines, time periods, and market segments. This metric helps businesses determine pricing strategies, identify cost-saving opportunities, and make resource allocation decisions.

A declining total revenue share typically indicates improving efficiency, while an increasing share may signal rising costs or pricing pressures. Industry benchmarks vary significantly, with manufacturing businesses typically experiencing higher total revenue shares than service-based companies.

== Relationship to gross margin ==
The total revenue share maintains an inverse relationship with gross margin. The formula relationship is:

Gross Margin = 100% - Total Revenue Share

In the previous example with a 60% total revenue share, the gross margin equals 40%. This relationship makes total revenue share particularly useful for companies seeking to analyze both cost structures and profit potential simultaneously.^{6}

This section should be placed as a standalone section immediately after the introduction of the article, before any subsections that might discuss specific components of revenue or cost structures.
