= Fixed cost =

Business expenses not dependant on output

Decomposing total costs as fixed costs plus variable costs. Quantity of output is measured on the horizontal axis. Along with variable costs, fixed costs make up one of the two components of total cost: total cost is equal to fixed costs plus variable costs.

In accounting and economics, fixed costs, also known as indirect costs or overhead costs, are business expenses that are not dependent on the level of goods or services produced by the business. They tend to be recurring, such as interest or rents being paid per month. These costs also tend to be capital costs. This is in contrast to variable costs, which are volume-related (and are paid per quantity produced) and unknown at the beginning of the accounting year. Fixed costs have an effect on the nature of certain variable costs.

For example, a retailer must pay rent and utility bills irrespective of sales. As another example, for a bakery the monthly rent and phone line are fixed costs, irrespective of how much bread is produced and sold; on the other hand, the wages are variable costs, as more workers would need to be hired for the production to increase. For any factory, the fixed cost should be all the money paid on capitals and land. Such fixed costs as buying machines and land cannot be changed, no matter how much they produce or whether they produce at all. Some writers also refer to "mixed costs" or semi-variable costs, which are partially fixed and partially variable: thus telephone costs could be treated as "mixed" because the total cost would include the variable cost of actual calls. Raw materials are one of the variable costs, depending on the quantity produced.

Fixed costs are considered an entry barrier for new entrepreneurs. In marketing, it is necessary to know how costs divide between variable and fixed costs. This distinction is crucial in forecasting the earnings generated by various changes in unit sales and thus the financial impact of proposed marketing campaigns. In a survey of nearly 200 senior marketing managers, 60 percent responded that they found the "variable and fixed costs" metric very useful. These costs affect each other and are both extremely important to entrepreneurs.

In economics, there is a fixed cost for a factory in the short run, and the fixed cost is immutable. But in the long run, there are only variable costs, because they control all factors of production.

== Description ==
Fixed costs are not permanently fixed; they will change over time, but are fixed, by contractual obligation, in relation to the quantity of production for the relevant period. In other words, there is a recurring cost, but the value of this cost is not permanently fixed. For example, a company may have unexpected and unpredictable expenses unrelated to production, such as warehouse costs and the like that are fixed only over the time period of the lease. By definition, there are no fixed costs in the long run, because the long run is a sufficient period of time for all short-run fixed inputs to become variable. Investments in facilities, equipment, and the basic organization that cannot be significantly reduced in a short period of time are referred to as committed fixed costs. Discretionary fixed costs usually arise from annual decisions by management to spend on certain fixed cost items. Examples of discretionary costs are advertising, insurance premia, machine maintenance, and research & development expenditures. Discretionary fixed costs can be expensive.

In economics, the most commonly spoken about fixed costs are those that have to do with capital. Capital can be the fixed price for buying a warehouse for production, machines (which can be paid once at the beginning and not depend on quantity or time of production), and it can be a certain total for the salaries of a certain quantity of unskilled labor. Many things are included in fixed costs depending on the product and market - some firms may decide to hold some resources at fixed rates that other companies may not - but these unexpected or predictable short term fixed costs can be the reason a firm doesn't enter the market (if the costs are too high). These costs and variable costs have to be taken into account when a firm wants to determine if they can enter a market.

In business planning and management accounting, usage of the terms fixed costs, variable costs and others will often differ from usage in economics, and may depend on the context. Some cost accounting practices such as activity-based costing will allocate fixed costs to business activities for profitability measures. This can simplify decision-making, but can be confusing and controversial. In accounting terminology, fixed costs will broadly include almost all costs (expenses) which are not included in cost of goods sold, and variable costs are those captured in costs of goods sold under the variable costing method. Under full (absorption) costing fixed costs will be included in both the cost of goods sold and in the operating expenses. The implicit assumption required to make the equivalence between the accounting and economics terminology is that the accounting period is equal to the period in which fixed costs do not vary in relation to production. In practice, this equivalence does not always hold, and depending on the period under consideration by management, some overhead expenses (e.g., sales, general and administrative expenses) can be adjusted by management, and the specific allocation of each expense to each category will be decided under cost accounting. In recent years, fixed costs gradually exceed variable costs for many companies. There are two reasons. Firstly, automatic production increases the cost of investment equipment, including the depreciation and maintenance of old equipment. Secondly, labor costs are often considered as long-term costs. It is difficult to adjust human resources according to the actual work needs in short term. As a result, direct labor costs are now regarded as fixed costs.

== See also ==
- Flat rate
- Cost curve
