= Customer profitability analysis =

Customer Profitability Analysis (CPA) is a management accounting and a credit underwriting method, allowing businesses and lenders to determine the profitability of each customer or segments of customers, by attributing profits and costs to each customer separately. CPA can be applied at the individual customer level (more time-consuming, but providing a better understanding of business situation) or at the level of customer aggregates / groups (e.g. grouped by number of transactions, revenues, average transaction size, time since starting business with the customer, distribution channels, etc.).

CPA is a "retrospective" method, which means it analyses past events of different customers, in order to calculate customer profitability for each customer. Equally, research suggests that credit score does not necessarily impact the lenders' profitability.

== Reasons for introducing CPA ==
Management accounting systems often focus on products, departments, or geographic regions, but not on customers. As a result, companies are often unable to produce reliable per-customer profitability figures, which leads to keeping unprofitable customers, decreasing company's potential to make profits.

The "why?" of Customer Profitability Analysis can be reduced to the simple statement that each dollar of revenue does not contribute equally to profit. Differences in customer profitability can arise from either differences in revenues and/or differences in costs. In other words, customer profitability depends not only on the revenue resulting from sold units of a product or service, but also on the 'back end' services provided, including marketing, distribution, and customer service. Once costs are matched with customer revenues, segments of differing profitability can be discovered.

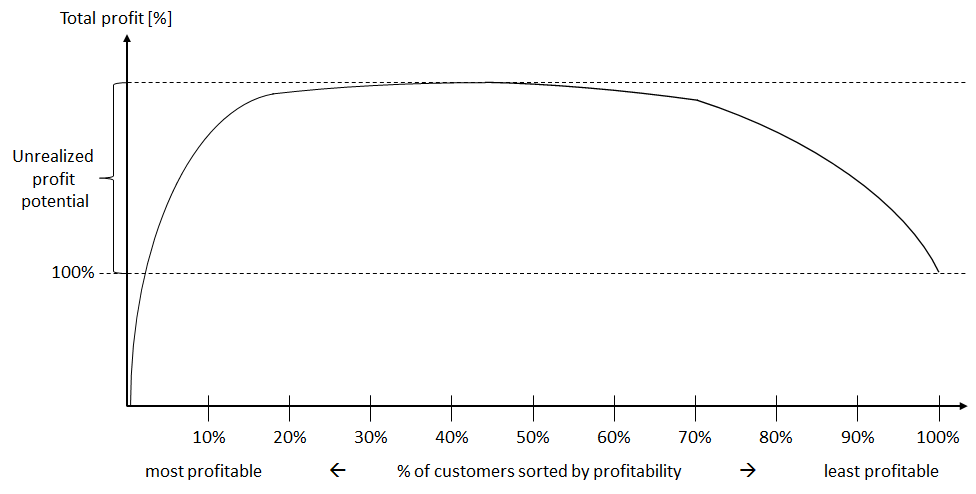
Whale curve - cumulative customer profitability

According to Harvard Professors: Robert Kaplan (who is co-developer of activity-based costing) and V.G. Narayanan, the 20-80 Pareto rule does not apply to customer profitability for organizations. The whale curve for cumulative profitability (see picture) usually reveals that the most profitable 20 percent of customers generate between 150 percent and 300 percent of total profits. The middle 60-70 percent of customers break even and the least profitable 10-20 percent of customers lose from 50 to 200 percent of total profits, leaving the company with its 100 percent of total profits. On the profitability whale curve, the difference between the highest point of the chart and current company profitability (100% profitability) represents unrealized profit potential for the company.

Typically companies have both: customers having positive impact on company profitability, and simultaneously those who erode potential profits of a company, by generating less revenue than costs - thus having a negative impact on company profitability. Often even managers who understand the issue are not able to easily distinct between customers belonging to these 2 groups. The size of customer is not a valid premise that the customer is automatically profitable, in fact the evidence suggests that even the largest customers may turn out to be the most unprofitable.

== Objective ==
The main purpose of CPA is to provide to organization management with the understanding of each customer profitability. Grouping this information into customer profitability segments, allows the companies to take different, targeted actions and strategies against different profitability segments, having as a target increasing the company's total profitability. Those companies that understand which customers are more profitable and which are not are “armed with valuable information needed to make successful managerial decision to improve overall organizational profitability”.

CPA allows businesses to take the following key strategic decisions:

- Identify customers’ profiles;
- Differentiate customer service activities depending on customer profile (e.g. highly-profitable customers could receive more attention, to ensure high-level satisfaction and loyalty, in order to protect continued business relations);
- Differentiate marketing strategy, depending on customer profile (e.g. implement more aggressive and expensive marketing strategies to high-spenders, while limiting the marketing costs against customers, who spend little and show few signs of spending more in the future);
- Take actions, to maintain or increase customers profitability, including turning unprofitable customers into profitable ones (e.g. decreasing cost to serve, of looking for ways to increase revenue, up to ceasing business relations with unprofitable customers to cut the costs).

== Input information ==
Calculation of customer profitability takes into account both revenue associated to each customer, as well as all costs which can be attributed to the customer.

=== Revenue associated to the customer ===
Revenue differences across customers may differ due to various reasons, including:

- Differences in price charged for a unit a product or service to different customers;
- Differences in volumes sold to different customers;
- Differences in product or service specification delivered to different customers;
- Other one-time events, such as bonus events, not directly related to a particular sale transaction.

CPA requires a company to associate all company's revenue to different customers (sources of revenue), in order to find out revenue associated to each customer. Companies most typically have no trouble finding out the amount of revenue attributed to a particular customer, thus article will not cover this aspect.

=== Costs associated to the customer ===
Customers differ in costs they generate by using company's resources in a different way. These reasons may include:

- Different amounts of marketing costs may be necessary to strike a deal with different customers
- Differences in used distribution channels / logistics by different customers
- ادهم
- Differences in volume of products purchased (production of large volume of a product for a single order can be cheaper that production of the same amount, divided into many orders, requested by many customers)

CPA requires the company to associate all company's costs to different customers, even if the costs are not directly related to any particular customer. Some costs can be easily associated with a particular customer (i.e. direct costs associated to all products sold to the customer), while other costs (indirect costs / overhead, such as electricity bills for running a production plant) are not easy to be associated to a particular customer. There are several cost accounting methods, which can be used for this purpose, one commonly used method is activity based costing.

In order to provide the best input to further management optimization activities, it's recommended to divide the costs assigned to each customer, to different cost pools. These cost pools should be defined depending on company's business, and can include product creation, processing purchase orders, shipping, invoicing, product samples, marketing, customer service, etc.

== CPA results ==
=== Customer profitability check ===
Possessing information defined above in "Input" chapter, management / accounting team can execute various different calculations, rankings, and comparisons between different customers / customer segments, necessary to reaching further conclusions and taking action. Few examples are displayed below, but the scope of calculations should be aligned to the company's business model.

- Calculate operating income associated to the customer - if the results is above 0, customer is bringing positive effect on the company, while if it is negative, company is currently losing money by conducting business with this customer;
- Calculate operating income / revenue associated to the customer - this metric gives understanding, which part of revenue becomes operating income;
- Compare customer particular cost pool ratio to average customer ratio - e.g. if 20% of total costs of Customer A is applicable to customer service, while on average, for entire customer base, customer service costs are 10% of total costs, company if given interesting information allowing to take action (look for ways to reduce Customer A customer service costs);
- other.

As a result of above, company becomes empowered to take targeted action / strategies against particular customers, or overall strategies against selected customer aggregates or whole customer base.

CPA therefore allows the company to uncover groups of customers that will likely respond best to profit improvement programs. Once the profit contribution of each customer group is known, further analysis is possible. For example, the Stobachoff curve can be used to illustrate the distribution of profitability graphically: The bigger the area under the curve, the greater the subsidization of unprofitable customer accounts by those that are profitable.

Literature suggests different strategies towards customers, depending on their profitability. Below are few examples from available literature, nonetheless each company may apply another strategy, better fitting into this particular organization business model, by either modifying below mentioned methods, or employing completely new ones.

=== Customer Classification Matrix (cost to serve / revenue) ===
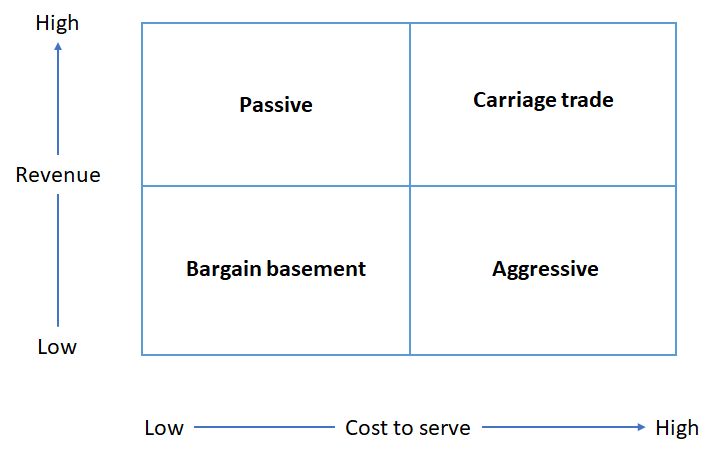
Customer Classification Matrix

The Customer Classification Matrix (matrix of customer revenue and cost to serve) method was suggested by several literature positions.

This categorization shows there are several different ways companies can serve profitable customers. Most valuable customers are in the passive category, generating high revenue at little costs. These are the most profitable customers, which company should pay special attention to. Some customers generating high revenue, could at the same time be expensive (carriage trade quadrant) – these may be profitable, if revenue exceeds the costs to serve. There could be customers who are easy to serve, but also bring little profits (bargain basement quadrant). Finally, the last quadrant (aggressive) is listing customers generating high costs and bringing low revenue. By performing CPA, companies could assign their customer to above quadrants and apply different strategies towards each of the quadrants.

For example:

- Aggressive - company could renegotiate with these customers their delivery terms / pricing / scope of services (to increase revenue), or reconsider internal processes to decrease costs of serving to those customers. Finally, a company could request an increased price for their services, ultimately losing unprofitable customers.
- Bargain basement - company could focus on increasing revenue for these customers, starting with conducting research whether these customers are expecting different services, their price sensitivity, etc.
- Passive - since passive customers generate most profit the company, company should consider investing their capital into better serving these customers, increasing their satisfaction and loyalty.
- Carriage trade - company should focus on reducing the cost to serve, investigating cost factors and looking for ways to streamline internal processes.

=== 4 boxes (profitability / strategy alignment) ===
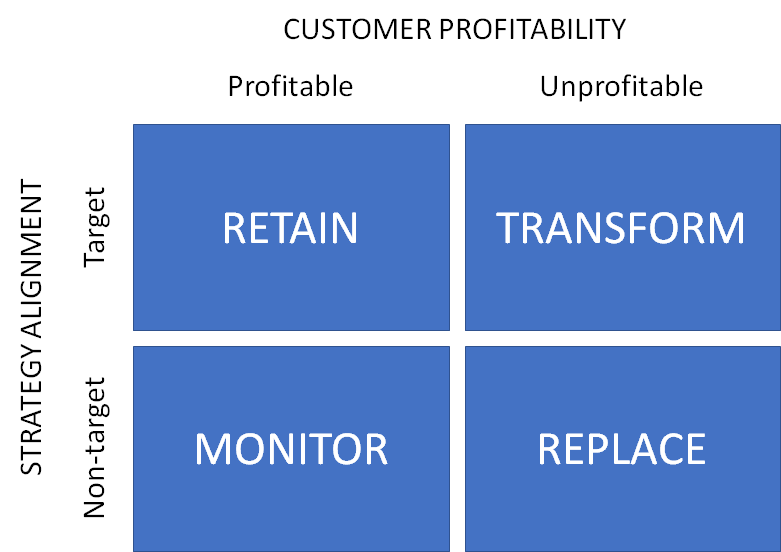
4 boxes - Strategy alignment and Customer Profitability

This 4-boxes (matrix of customer profitability and strategy alignment) method was suggested by several literature positions.

The foundation of the method is ability to decide, which customers are Target customers of a company (aligned to company's business strategy), and which are not. Given additionally the results of CPA (customer profitability), all customers are segmented into 4 segments, each having a different strategy to be applied to the customers:

- Profitable customers in "Target" group are associated to the action "RETAIN" - company should look into the possibility of increasing business relations with those customers, as long as business model will not significantly change;
- Profitable customers in "Non-target" group are associated to the action "MONITOR" - these customers need to be closely monitored, to make sure they don't fall into "Non-target" and unprofitable segment;
- Unprofitable customers in "Target" group as associated to the action "TRANSFORM" - company should employ different strategies to make these customers into profitable segment, or at the very least, to bring them into break-even point. The strategies to be used will differ, depending on the company-customer business circumstances.
- Unprofitable customers in "Non-target" group are associated to the action "REPLACE" - company should cease efforts into developing these customers. Suggested solution is to increase product or service selling prices up to the point, where the customer would either fall into "MONITOR" segment, or take their business to another provider. If that happens, company could refocus freed resources into serving the most desirable (profitable) customers.

== Limitations / implementation barriers ==
Using CPA is associated with some difficulties & limitations:

- Most importantly, CPA is a backward-looking tool, meaning it analyses past events, providing results, based on which companies are making their strategic choices. Past however may not always be the determinant of the future, and decisions made based on past events only, could be incorrect if market conditions, or business strategy change;
- The cost of acquisition and customer service may be difficult to measure;
- Performing ABC or other methods of attributing costs to customers, CPA calculations, outlining distinct strategies towards different groups of customers, communicating internally and implementing those strategies can be a large undertaking for an organization in terms of the resources used and the costs to complete the initiative, requiring specialized knowledge and appropriately developed accounting systems;
- People often feel threatened by change, do not understand it, and are opposed to it within a company (e.g. Commission salespersons will try to protect customers even though they may not be profitable to the company).

=== Overcoming limitations ===
There are various strategies which could be used to minimize limitations / implementation barriers to introduce CPA, including the following ones:

- Management needs to be sensitive to required change within the organization and be sure that employees are included in the decision and change processes. Management should seek to ensure employee buy-in, to minimize resistance towards change;
- Management needs to properly set internal incentive model, e.g. rewarding salespeople on the basis of customer profitability, as opposed to revenue generated by the customer;
- To minimize the limitation resulting from the fact, that CPA is a backwards-looking tool, a company could additionally consider implementation of Customer Lifetime Value (CLV). CLV is a forward-looking customer profitability estimator, taking CPA as a starting point for calculation. CLV could be used for forecasting of future customer profitability (based not only on historical events, but also proposed marketing strategy, trends in customer behavior, etc.).
