= Job costing =

Accounting practice

Job costing is accounting which tracks the costs and revenues by "job" and enables standardized reporting of profitability by job. For an accounting system to support job costing, it must allow job numbers to be assigned to individual items of expenses and revenues. A job can be defined to be a specific project done for one customer, or a single unit of product manufactured, or a batch of units of the same type that are produced together.

To apply job costing in a manufacturing setting involves tracking which "job" uses various types of direct expenses such as direct labour and direct materials, and then allocating overhead costs (indirect labor, warranty costs, quality control and other overhead costs) to the jobs. A job profitability report is like an overall profit & loss statement for the firm, but is specific to each job number.

Job costing may assess all costs involved in a construction "job" or in the manufacturing of goods done in discrete batches. These costs are recorded in ledger accounts throughout the life of the job or batch and are then summarized in the final trial balance before the preparing of the job cost or batch manufacturing statement.

== Job costing vs. process costing ==
Job costing (known by some as job order costing, a subset of which is project accounting) is fundamental to managerial accounting. It differs from Process costing in that the flow of costs is tracked by job or batch instead of by process. The distinction between job costing and process costing hinges on the nature of the product and, therefore, on the type of production process:

- Process costing is used when the products are more homogeneous in nature. Conversely, job costing systems assign costs to distinct production jobs that are significantly different. An average cost per unit of product is then calculated for each job.
- Process costing systems assign costs to one or more production processes. Because all units are identical or very similar, average costs for each unit of product are calculated by dividing the process costs by the number of units produced.
- Many businesses produce products with some unique features and some common processes. These businesses use costing systems that have both job and process costing features.

== Using job costing ==
Job Costing is the process of determining the labor and materials cost for each job in a systematic way, and then using this information to create a quote for the customer. Job costing or cost accounting can be used in virtually any industry (especially service industry) to ensure that the product pricing covers actual costs, overhead and provides a profit. The purpose of any business is to make money, and job costing is the most effective way to ensure that occurs. In a job costing system, costs may be accumulated either by job or by batch. For a typical job, direct material, labor, subcontract costs, equipment, and other direct costs are tracked at their actual values. These are accrued until the job or batch is completed. Overhead or "burden" may be applied either by using a rate based on direct labor hours or by using some other Activity Based Costing cost driver. In either case, once overhead/burden is added, the total cost for the job can be determined. If the accountant is using a general ledger accounting system, which lacks true job costing functionality, the costs must be manually transferred out of Work in Process to Finished Goods (Cost of Goods Sold for service industries). Of course, in the days of computerized job costing software, journaling costs manually is an obsolete process. Such hand-journaling is mandatory for companies that continue to use general accounting software to do job costing. Enlightened accountants are moving forward and using job costing software, thereby improving cost control, reducing risk, and increasing the chance of profitability.

== Using cost codes in budgeting ==
In a true job cost accounting system, a budget is set up in advance of the job. As actual costs are accrued, they are compared to budgeted costs, to determine variances for each phase of each job. Cost Codes are used for each phase, allowing "mini-budgets" to be generated and tracked. In the construction industry, the Construction Specifications Institute (CSI) has established an industry standard Cost Coding system. The job costing system consists of various cost drivers that drive job costs.

== Example ==
These examples will assume that overhead is allocated on the basis of Direct Labor Hours. Direct Material is abbreviated DM, Direct Labor as DL, and Overhead as OH.

XYZ corporation manufactures airplanes. 1 order was completed (#110), 2 received further work (#111, 112), and 1 new order was received (#113). Overhead is allocated at a rate of $100/DL Hour. All employees earn $20/hour. Beginning Work In Process Balances are as follows: #110, $25,000; #111, $10,000; #112, $12,000; #113 $0 (New Order). Below are the amounts of DM and DL used.

- #110 $2,000 DM, 25 DL hours. Therefore, $5,000 in new cost is added ($2,000 DM, $500 DL, $2,500 OH). The job had a total cost of $30,000. this amount is transferred out of Work in Process to Finished Goods or Cost of Goods Sold.
- #111 $3,000 DM, 30 DL hours. Therefore, $6,600 in new cost is added ($3,000 DM, $600 DL, $3,000 OH). The job has a new total cost of $16,600. This amount remains in Work in Process until completion.
- #112 $5,000 DM, 100 DL hours. Therefore, $17,000 in new cost is added ($5,000 DM, $2,000 DL, $10,000 OH). The job has a new total cost of $29,000. This amount remains in Work in Process until completion.
- #113 $1,000 DM, 10 DL hours. Therefore, $2,200 in new cost is added ($1,000 DM, $200 DL, $1000 OH). The job has a new total cost of $2,200. This amount remains in Work in Process until completion.

Caution: overhead is allocated on the basis of DL hours. While in this case, allocating overhead on the basis of DL cost ($5 of overhead for every $1 DL cost) would produce the same result, this may not always be the case. Since rates are developed based on a budget, if employees are actually paid a different rate from the budgeted rate, allocating at a $5 to $1 ratio would produce a different cost from the stated $100/DL hour allocation. Companies use slightly different overhead allocation methods.
