= Cost accounting =

Procedures to optimize practices in cost efficient ways

Cost accounting is the process of recording, classifying, analyzing, allocating, and reporting an organization's costs. It is primarily used within management accounting to provide managers with information for planning, controlling operations, evaluating performance, pricing, and other business decisions. Unlike financial accounting, which is primarily concerned with reporting a business's financial position and results to external parties according to accounting standards, cost accounting is principally concerned with information for internal management.

Modern cost accounting developed during the Industrial Revolution as the increasing scale and complexity of businesses created a need to measure and allocate costs more systematically. Costs may be classified in several ways according to their relationship to products, business functions, production volume, controllability, timing, and managerial decisions. Basic cost elements include materials and labour, as well as expenses and other overheads, while common distinctions include direct and indirect costs and fixed and variable costs.

Cost accounting encompasses a range of methods designed for different managerial purposes. Some approaches are standard cost accounting and variance analysis, throughput accounting, activity-based costing, lean accounting, and marginal costing and cost–volume–profit analysis. These methods differ in how costs are measured and assigned and in the kinds of operational and strategic decisions they are intended to support.

== Origins of cost accounting ==
All types of businesses, whether manufacturing, trading or producing services, require cost accounting to track their activities. Cost accounting has long been used to help managers understand the costs of running a business. Modern cost accounting originated during the Industrial Revolution when the complexities of running large scale businesses led to the development of systems for recording and tracking costs to help business owners and managers make decisions. Various techniques used by cost accountants include standard costing and variance analysis, marginal costing and cost volume profit analysis, budgetary control, uniform costing, inter firm comparison, etc. Evaluation of cost accounting is mainly due to the limitations of financial accounting. Moreover, maintenance of cost records has been made compulsory in selected industries as notified by the government from time to time.

In the early industrial age most of the costs incurred by a business were what modern accountants call "variable costs" because they varied directly with the amount of production. Money was spent on labour, raw materials, the power to run a factory, etc., in direct proportion to production. Managers could simply total the variable costs for a product and use this as a rough guide for decision-making processes.

Some costs tend to remain the same even during idle periods, unlike variable costs, which rise and fall with volume of work (and thus variable costs are higher in busy periods, and fall during idle periods). Over time, these "fixed costs" have become more important to managers. Examples of fixed costs include the depreciation of plant and equipment, and the cost of departments such as maintenance, tooling, production control, purchasing, quality control, storage and handling, plant supervision and engineering.

In the early nineteenth century, these costs were of little importance to most businesses. However, with the growth of railroads, steel and large scale manufacturing, by the late nineteenth century these costs were often more important than the variable cost of a product, and allocating them to a broad range of products led to bad decision making. Managers must understand fixed costs in order to make decisions about products and pricing.

For example: a company produces railway coaches and has only one product. To make each coach, the company needs to purchase $60 of raw materials and components and pay 6 labourers $40 each. Therefore, the total variable cost for each coach was $300. Knowing that making a coach requires spending $300, managers know they cannot sell below that price without losing money on each coach. Any price above $300 would make a contribution to the fixed costs of the company. If the fixed costs are, say, $1000 per month for rent, insurance and owner's salary, the company could therefore sell 5 coaches per month for a total of $3000 (priced at $600 each), or 10 coaches for a total of $4500 (priced at $450 each), and make a profit of $500 in each case.

== Cost accounting vs financial accounting ==
Differences between cost and financial accounting
Cost accounting	Financial accounting
Computes costs in a rigorous manner that facilitates cost control and cost reduction.	Analyzes transitions in the current accounting period into financial statements (Statement of Cash Flows, Profit or Loss, Balance Sheet, etc.).
Reports only to the organization's internal management to aid their decision-making.	Reports the results and financial position of the business to the government, creditors, investors, and other external parties.
Cost classifications are based on functions, activities, products, processes, and the information needs of the organization in its planning and control.	Cost classifications based on the types of transactions.
Combines objective and subjective assessment of costs contributing to a standard result.	Aims to present a 'true and fair' view of transactions.
Information can be presented as accountants see fit.	Must adhere to accounting standards such as the IFRS and GAAP.

== Cost accounting methods ==
The following are some of the different cost accounting approaches:

- Activity-based costing
- Cost–volume–profit analysis
- Environmental accounting
- Joint cost
- Process costing
- Project accounting
- Resource consumption accounting
- Standard cost accounting
- Target costing
- Throughput accounting
- True cost accounting
- Life-cycle costing

== Elements of cost accounting ==
Basic cost elements are:

1. Material
2. Labour
3. Expenses and other overheads

=== Material (inventory) ===
The materials directly contributed to a product and those easily identifiable in the finished product are called direct materials. For example, paper in books, wood in furniture, plastic in a water tank, and leather in shoes are direct materials. Other, usually lower cost items or supporting material used in the production of in a finished product are called indirect materials. For example, lubricants used to keep machines running, or the chemicals used during the garment manufacturing processes.

Furthermore, these can be categorized into three different types of inventories that must be accounted for in different ways; raw materials, work-in-progress, and finished goods.

=== Labour ===
Any wages paid to workers or a group of workers which may directly co-relate to any specific activity of production, maintenance, transportation of material, or product, and directly associate in the conversion of raw material into finished goods are called direct labour. Wages paid to trainees or apprentices does not come under the category of direct labour as they have no significant value.

=== Overheads ===
Overheads include:

- Production or works overhead including factory staff
- Administration overhead including office staff
- Sales overhead including production and maintenance of catalogues, advertising (development and purchases), exhibitions, sales staff, cost of money
- Distribution overhead
- Maintenance and repair including office equipment and factory machinery
- Supplies
- Utilities including gas, electric, water, sewer, and municipal assessments
- Other variable expenses
- Salaries/payroll including wages, pensions, and paycheck deductions (e.g., National Insurance and PAYE in the UK, FICA in the US)
- Occupancy (rent, mortgage, property taxes)
- Depreciation (durable goods including machinery and office equipment)
- Other fixed expenses

These categories are flexible, sometimes overlapping as different cost accounting principles are applied.

== Classification of costs ==
Important classifications of costs include:

1. By nature or traceability: Direct costs and indirect costs. Direct costs are directly attributable/traceable to cost objects, while indirect costs (not being directly attributable) are allocated or apportioned to cost objects.
2. By function: production, administration, selling and distribution, or research and development.
3. By behavior: fixed, variable, or semi-variable. Fixed costs remain unchanged irrespective of changes in the production volume over a given period of time. Variable costs change according to the volume of production. Semi-variable costs are partly fixed and partly variable.
4. By controllability: Controllable costs are those which can be controlled or influenced by conscious management action. Uncontrollable costs cannot be controlled or influenced by conscious management action.
5. By normality: normal costs and abnormal costs. Normal costs arise during routine day-to-day business operations. Abnormal costs arise because of any abnormal activity or event not part of routine business operations, such as accidents or natural disasters.
6. By time: Historical costs and predetermined costs. Historical costs are costs incurred in the past. Predetermined costs are computed in advance on basis of factors affecting cost elements.
7. By decision-making costs: These costs are used for managerial decision making:
  1. Marginal costs: The marginal cost is the change in the total cost caused by increasing or decreasing output by one unit.
  2. Differential costs: This cost is the difference in total cost resulting from selecting one alternative over another.
  3. Opportunity costs: The value of a benefit sacrificed in favour of an alternative course of action.
  4. Relevant cost: The relevant cost is a cost which is relevant in various decisions of management.
  5. Replacement cost: This cost is the cost at which existing items of material or fixed assets can be replaced at present or at a future date.
  6. Shutdown cost: Costs incurred if operations are shut down, and which would not occur if operations are continued.
  7. Capacity cost: The cost incurred by a company for providing production, administration and selling and distribution capabilities in order to perform various functions. These costs are normally fixed costs.
  8. Sunk cost: A cost already incurred, which cannot be recovered.
  9. Other costs

== Standard cost accounting ==
Standard Costing is a technique of Cost Accounting to compare the actual costs with standard costs (that are pre-defined) with the help of Variance Analysis. It is used to understand the variations of product costs in manufacturing. Standard costing allocates fixed costs incurred in an accounting period to the goods produced during that period. This allowed the full cost of products that were not sold in the period they were produced to be recorded as 'inventory' in the Balance sheet to be carried forward to the next accounting period, using a variety of complex accounting methods, which was consistent with the principles of GAAP (Generally Accepted Accounting Principles). It also essentially enabled managers to ignore the fixed costs, and look at the results of each period in relation to the "standard cost" for any given product.

For Example: if the railway coach company normally produced 40 coaches per month, and the fixed costs were still $1000/month, then each coach could be said to incur an Operating Cost/overhead of $25 =($1000 / 40). Adding this to the variable costs of $300 per coach produced a full cost of $325 per coach.

This method tended to slightly distort the resulting unit cost, but in mass-production industries that made one product line, and where the fixed costs were relatively low, the distortion was very minor.

For Example: if the railway coach company made 100 coaches one month, then the unit cost would become $310 per coach ($300 + ($1000 / 100)). If the next month the company made 50 coaches, then the unit cost = $320 per coach ($300 + ($1000 / 50)), a relatively minor difference.

An important part of standard cost accounting is a variance analysis, which breaks down the variation between actual cost and standard costs into various components (volume variation, material cost variation, labor cost variation, etc.) so managers can understand why costs were different from what was planned and take appropriate action to correct the situation.

== The development of throughput accounting ==
As business became more complex and began producing a greater variety of products, the use of cost accounting to make decisions to maximize profitability came into question. Management circles became increasingly aware of the theory of constraints in the 1980s and began to understand that "every production process has a limiting factor" somewhere in the chain of production. As business management learned to identify the constraints, they increasingly adopted throughput accounting to manage them and "maximize the throughput dollars" (or other currency) from each unit of constrained resource.

Throughput accounting aims to make the best use of scarce resources (bottleneck) in a JIT (Just in time) environment.

"Throughput", in this context, refers to the amount of money obtained from sales minus the cost of materials that have gone into making them.

=== Mathematical formulae ===
$$\text{throughput cost accounting ratio} = \frac{\text{return}}{\text {factory hours}}$$
$$\text{throughput} = \text{sales} - \text{material costs}$$

== Activity-based costing ==
Activity-based costing (ABC) is a system for assigning costs to products based on the activities they require. In this case, activities are those regular actions performed inside a company. "Talking with the customer regarding invoice questions" is an example of activity inside most companies.

Companies may be moved to adopt ABC by a need to improve costing accuracy, that is, understand better the true costs and profitability of individual products, services, or initiatives. ABC gets closer to true costs in these areas by turning many costs that standard cost accounting views as indirect costs essentially into direct costs. By contrast, standard cost accounting typically determines so-called indirect and overhead costs simply as a percentage of certain direct costs, which may or may not reflect actual resource usage for individual items.

Under ABC, accountants assign 100% of each employee's time to the different activities performed inside a company (many will use surveys to have the workers themselves assign their time to the different activities). The accountant then can determine the total cost spent on each activity by summing up the percentage of each worker's salary spent on that activity.

A company can use the resulting activity cost data to determine where to focus its operational improvements. For example, a job-based manufacturer may find that a high percentage of its workers are spending their time trying to figure out a hastily written customer order. Via (ABC) Activity-based costing, the accountants now have a currency amount pegged to the activity of "Researching Customer Work Order Specifications". Senior management can now decide how much focus or money to budget for resolving this process deficiency. Activity-based management includes (but is not restricted to) the use of activity-based costing to manage a business.

While (ABC) Activity-based costing may be able to pinpoint the cost of each activity and resources into the ultimate product, the process could be tedious, costly and subject to errors.

As it is a tool for a more accurate way of allocating fixed costs into a product, these fixed costs do not vary according to each month's production volume. For example, the elimination of one product would not eliminate the overhead or even direct labour cost assigned to it. Activity-based costing (ABC) better identifies product costing in the long run, but may not be too helpful in day-to-day decision-making.

== Integrating EVA and process-based costing ==
Recently, Mocciaro Li Destri, Picone and Minà (2012) proposed a performance and cost measurement system that integrates the Economic Value Added criteria with Process-Based Costing (PBC). The EVA-PBC methodology allows us to implement the EVA management logic not only at the firm level, but also at lower levels of the organization. EVA-PBC methodology plays an interesting role in bringing strategy back into financial performance measures.

== Lean accounting ==
Lean accounting has developed in recent years to provide the accounting, control, and measurement methods supporting lean manufacturing and other applications of lean thinking such as healthcare, construction, insurance, banking, education, government and other industries.

There are two main thrusts for Lean Accounting. The first is the application of lean methods to the company's accounting, control, and measurement processes. This is not different from applying lean methods to any other processes. The objective is to eliminate waste, free up capacity, speed up the process, eliminate errors & defects, and make the process clear and understandable. The second (and more important) thrust of Lean Accounting is to fundamentally change the accounting, control, and measurement processes so they motivate lean change & improvement, provide information that is suitable for control and decision-making, provide an understanding of customer value, correctly assess the financial impact of lean improvement, and are themselves simple, visual, and low-waste. Lean Accounting does not require the traditional management accounting methods like standard costing, activity-based costing, variance reporting, cost-plus pricing, complex transactional control systems, and untimely and confusing financial reports. These are replaced by:

- lean-focused performance measurements
- simple summary direct costing of the value streams
- decision-making and reporting using a box score
- financial reports that are timely and presented in "plain English" that everyone can understand.
- radical simplification and elimination of transactional control systems by eliminating the need for them.
- driving lean changes from a deep understanding of the value created for the customers.
- eliminating traditional budgeting through monthly sales, operations, and financial planning processes (SOFP)
- value-based pricing
- correct understanding of the financial impact of lean change

As an organization becomes more mature with lean thinking and methods, they recognize that the combined methods of lean accounting in fact creates a lean management system (LMS) designed to provide the planning, the operational and financial reporting, and the motivation for change required to prosper the company's on-going lean transformation.

== Marginal costing ==
The cost-volume-profit analysis is the systematic examination of the relationship between selling prices, sales, production volumes, costs, expenses and profits. This analysis provides very useful information for decision-making in the management of a company. For example, the analysis can be used in establishing sales prices, in the product mix selection to sell, in the decision to choose marketing strategies, and in the analysis of the impact on profits by changes in costs. In the current environment of business, a business administration must act and take decisions in a fast and accurate manner. As a result, the importance of cost-volume-profit is still increasing as time passes.

CONTRIBUTION MARGIN

A relationship between the cost, volume and profit is the contribution margin. The contribution margin is the revenue excess from sales over variable costs. The concept of contribution margin is particularly useful in the planning of business because it gives an insight into the potential profits that a business can generate. The following chart shows the income statement of a company X, which has been prepared to show its contribution margin:

Sales	$1,000,000
(-) Variable Costs	$600,000
Contribution Margin	$400,000
(-) Fixed Costs	$300,000
Income from Operations	$100,000

CONTRIBUTION MARGIN RATIO

The contribution margin can also be expressed as a percentage. The contribution margin ratio, which is sometimes called the profit-volume ratio, indicates the percentage of each sales dollar available to cover fixed costs and to provide operating revenue. For the company Fusion, Inc. the contribution margin ratio is 40%, which is computed as follows:

$$\text{Contribution Margin Ratio} = (\text{Sales - Variable Costs}) / \text{Sales}$$

The contribution margin ratio measures the effect on operating income of an increase or a decrease in sales volume. For example, assume that the management of Fusion, Inc. is studying the effect of adding $80,000 in sales orders. Multiplying the contribution margin ratio (40%) by the change in sales volume ($80,000) indicates that operating income will increase $32,000 if additional orders are obtained. To validate this analysis the table below shows the income statement of the company including additional orders:

Sales	$1,080,000
(-) Variable Costs	$648,000 (1,080,000 x 60%)
Contribution Margin	$432,000 (1,080,000 x 40%)
(-) Fixed Costs	$300,000
Income from Operations	$132,000

Variable costs as a percentage of sales are equal to 100% minus the contribution margin ratio. Thus, in the above income statement, the variable costs are 60% (100% - 40%) of sales, or $648,000 ($1,080,000 X 60%). The total contribution margin $432,000, can also be computed directly by multiplying the sales by the contribution margin ratio ($1,080,000 X 40%).

== Government procurement ==
The United States' federal procurement rules (the Federal Acquisition Regulation, FAR) require government Contracting Officers negotiating contract prices to verify that suppliers' cost submissions are in accordance with the government's contract cost principles and procedures and, in certain cases, the requirements and procedures of the federal Cost Accounting Standards. Relevant cost data or pricing data may be required from the supplier, in order to undertake a "cost realism analysis", also known as a "price realism analysis". FAR defines a cost realism analysis as

The process of independently reviewing and evaluating specific elements of each offeror's proposed cost estimate to determine whether the estimated proposed cost elements are realistic for the work to be performed; reflect a clear understanding of the requirements; and are consistent with the unique methods of performance and materials described in the offeror's technical proposal.

Similarly, where a government agency requests a fixed price submission, provision may be made for a cost or price realism analysis to take place during the evaluation process.

== See also ==
- Accountancy
- Cost overrun
- Fixed asset turnover
- Management accounting
- IT cost transparency
- Kaizen costing
- Profit model
