= Virtual chargeback =

In information technology, virtual chargeback is a practice of charging back the costs of virtual IT infrastructure to departments or business units, that actually use it. This means analyzing and recording the resource utilisation on virtual machines (VMs).

== Purpose ==
The idea of chargeback in a traditional (non-virtualised) sense is not new, and references go as far back as the 1980s. Publications available on the Internet generally support the notion that chargeback involved charging departments based on actual resource consumption rather than forecast usage. Chargeback is most relevant to IT departments, simply because almost all areas of an organisation use computing resources. Rather than IT having to justify expenditures for another area of the organisation, the burden is on those departments who are actually planning on using the resource provided by IT.

Virtual chargeback can be a particularly difficult process to implement, due to the use of shared/common resources. However, the internal implementation of a chargeback process usually resides between the application and infrastructure layers, which gives the data-collection services of the application the ability to pull from virtual or actual components.

Reasons for using a chargeback model include:

• More effective use of IT services due to customers becoming more conscious of the cost associated with new hardware and software
• A better understanding of the TCO (total cost of ownership) for performing a business function
• Prevention of business groups being charged for applications and services they rarely use
• The entire IT infrastructure is taken into account (i.e. from network I/O through to storage)

== Challenges ==
While numerous tools exist for tracking asset utilisation in a traditional sense (such as Microsoft's Operations Manager), they are considered by some to be of limited use when it comes to virtual machines.

Numerous attempts have been made to address this problem, some of which are available today:

- VMware vCenter Chargeback,
- PlateSpin Recon,
- vKernel,
- Nicus M-PWR,
- Exivity, Hybrid Cloud metering & billing

== See also ==
- Cost centre (business)
- Cost accounting
- IT chargeback and showback
- Time-sharing
