= IT cost transparency =

Tracking the IT cost for a business or organization

IT cost transparency is a category of information technology management software and systems that enables enterprise IT organizations to model and track the total cost to deliver and maintain the IT Services they provide to the business. It is increasingly a task of management accounting. IT cost transparency solutions can integrate financial information such as labor costs, software licensing costs, hardware acquisition and depreciation, data center facilities charges from general ledger systems and combine this with operational data from ticketing, monitoring, asset management and project portfolio management systems to provide a single, integrated view of IT costs by service, department, GL line item and project. In addition to tracking cost elements, IT cost transparency may track utilization, usage and operational performance metrics in order to provide a measure of value or return on investment (ROI). Costs, budgets, performance metrics and changes to data points are tracked over time to identify trends and the impact of changes to underlying cost drivers in order to help managers address the key drivers in escalating IT costs and improve planning.

IT cost transparency combines elements of activity based costing, business intelligence, operational monitoring and performance dashboards. It provides the system on which to implement ITIL v3 Financial Management guidelines to assist with Financial Management for IT services and is closely related to IT Service Management.

== Capabilities ==
While specific solutions vary, capabilities can include:

- Simplified or automated collection of key cost driver data
- An allocation or cost modeling interface
- Custom reporting and analysis of unit cost drivers, including CIO dashboards
- Ability to track operational metrics such as utilization, service levels, support tickets along with cost
- Bill of IT reports for chargeback or service allocation to Lines of Business
- Forecast and budget tracking versus actual and over time
- Hypothetical scenario planning for new project ROI analysis
- Cost benchmarking against industry averages or common metrics
- Self-service portal for employees to manage assigned assets

== Analysts' comments ==
Globalization, consumerization, new competitors and new service models are radically changing the shape of IT. IT leaders must develop greater transparency into the costs, utilization and operations of their IT services,

— Barbara Gomolski, Dubie, Denise (November 3, 2008). "10 IT management start-ups to watch". Network World. Archived from the original on December 7, 2008.

"By making these costs transparent, the IT organization can fundamentally change the way business units consume IT resources, drive down total enterprise IT costs, and focus on IT spending that delivers real business value. The CIO who leads this change can usher in a new era of strategic IT management--and true partnership with the business." —Andrew M. Appel, Neeru Arora, and Raymond Zenkich. McKinsey & Company.

"Companies can get an understanding of the best candidates for virtualization or consolidation, for instance, and further reduce the cost of resources. IT organizations consistently try to become more efficient, and this type of detailed information enables visibility, billing and chargeback in the future," –

== IT Cost Breakdown ==
The average IT budget has the following breakdown:

25% – personnel costs (internal)
29% – software costs (external/purchasing category)
26% – hardware costs (external/purchasing category)
14% – costs of external service providers (external/services)

This is confirmed by independent research from McKinsey and the Sand-Hill Group.

In addition to the considerations above about the current volume of software asset costs, even more important is their growth – their absolute growth (in EUR) and relative growth (relative to growth of other costs in the IT budget). Software asset costs are growing, endogenously and exogenously:

- Endogenous growth – Recent technology shifts and IT cost reduction initiatives, e.g. server virtualization, remote desktops and cloud computing, have delivered flexibility and security in operations and a cost advantage on the hardware/infrastructure side – but have generated increased software demand, and thus supplementary costs, on the software asset side.
- Exogenous growth – Software vendors have transformed the process of discovering incompliance into a business model. The technology shift to virtualized/cloud environments has provided the right platform. Nowadays, most vendors have increased the complexity of licensing requirements, taking into account more attributes for more licensing metrics. They have accelerated the pace of change and created more pitfalls, thus increasing the level of software licensing expertise required in order to remain compliant.

== See also ==
- Cost management
- IT chargeback and showback
- IT Service Management
- ITIL
- Service level management
- Software as a service
