= Process costing =

Process costing is an accounting methodology that traces and accumulates direct costs, and allocates indirect costs of a manufacturing process. Costs are assigned to products, usually in a large batch, which might include an entire month's production. Eventually, costs have to be allocated to individual units of product. It assigns average costs to each unit, and is the opposite extreme of Job costing which attempts to measure individual costs of production of each unit. Process costing is usually a significant chapter. It is a method of assigning costs to units of production in companies producing large quantities of homogeneous products.

Process costing is a type of operation costing which is used to ascertain the cost of a product at each process or stage of manufacture. CIMA defines process costing as "The costing method applicable where goods or services result from a sequence of continuous or repetitive operations or processes. Costs are averaged over the units produced during the period". Process costing is suitable for industries producing homogeneous products and where production is a continuous flow. A process can be referred to as the sub-unit of an organization specifically defined for cost collection purpose.

== The importance of process costing ==
Costing is an important process that many companies engage in to keep track of where their money is being spent in the production and distribution processes. Understanding these costs is the first step in being able to control them. It is very important that a company chooses the appropriate type of costing system for their product type and industry. One type of costing system that is used in certain industries is process costing that varies from other types of costing (such as job costing) in some ways. In process costing unit costs are more like averages, the process-costing system requires less bookkeeping than does a job-order costing system. Thus, some companies often prefer to use the process-costing system.

== When is process costing applied? ==
Process costing is appropriate for companies that produce a continuous mass of like units through series of operations or process. Also, when one order does not affect the production process and a standardization of the process and product exists. However, if there are significant differences among the costs of various products, a process costing system would not provide adequate product-cost information. Costing is generally used in such industries such as petroleum, coal mining, chemicals, textiles, paper, plastic, glass, food, banks, courier, cement, and soap.

== Reasons for use ==
Company units of product in a given period of time.

- Products are manufactured in large quantities, but products may be sold in small quantities, sometimes one at a time (automobiles, loaves of bread), a dozen or two at a time (eggs, cookies), etc.
- Product costs must be transferred from Finished Goods to Cost of Goods Sold as sales are made. This requires a correct and accurate accounting of product costs per unit, to have a proper matching of product costs against related sales revenue.
- Managers need to maintain cost control over the manufacturing process. Process costing provides managers with feedback that can be used to compare similar product costs from one month to the next, keeping costs in line with projected manufacturing budgets.
- A fraction-of-a-cent cost change can represent a large dollar change in overall profitability, when selling millions of units of product a month. Managers must carefully watch per unit costs on a daily basis through the production process, while at the same time dealing with materials and output in huge quantities.
- Materials part way through a process (e.g. chemicals) might need to be given a value, process costing allows for this. By determining what cost the part processed material has incurred such as labor or overhead an "equivalent unit" relative to the value of a finished process can be calculated.

== Process cost procedures ==
There are four basic steps in accounting for Process cost:

- Summarize the flow of physical units of output.
- Compute output in terms of equivalent units.
- Summarize total costs to account for and Compute equivalent unit costs.
- Assign total costs to units completed and to units in ending work in process inventory.

The journal entries for process costing are the same as those for job-order costing with one exception. The entry to transfer cost from one work-in-process account to another is:

Work-in-process inventory-second department Debit (Left)

Work-in-process-first department Credit (Right)

e.g.(1) Micro Labs Company produces house paint in two processing departments: the Mixing Department which mixes the paint colors and the Finishing Department which puts the paint in containers and labels them. The following information related to the company's operation for October follows:

A) Raw materials were issued for use in production: Mixing department, $551,000, and the Finishing department, $629,000. B) Direct labor costs incurred: Mixing department $230,000, and Finishing department $270,000. C) Manufacturing overhead cost applied: Mixing department $665,000, and Finishing department, $405,000. D) The cost of the mixed paint transferred from the Mixing department to the Finishing department was $1,850,000. E) Paint that had been prepared for shipping was transferred from the Finishing department to Finished Goods. Cost of the transferred paint was $3,200,000.

Required: Prepare journal entries to record items A) through E) above.

Solution(1):

–Work in Process – Mixing           551,000
–Work in Process – Finishing        629,000
–Raw Materials                                 1,180,000
–Work in Process – Mixing           230,000
–Work in Process – Finishing        270,000
–Wages and Salaries Payable                    500,000
–Work in Process – Mixing           665,000
–Work in Process – Finishing        405,000
–Manufacturing Overhead                        1,070,000
–Work in Process – Finishing        1,850,000
–Work in Process – Mixing                      1,850,000
–Finished Goods                     3,200,000
–Work in Process – Finishing                   3,200,000

e.g.(2) Larney Corporation uses process costing. A number of transactions that occurred in June are listed below. As follows:

A) Raw materials that cost $38,200 are withdrawn from the storeroom for use in the Mixing Department. B) Direct labor costs incurred $36,500, in the Mixing Department. C) Manufacturing overhead of $42,100 is applied in the Mixing Department. D) Units with a carrying cost of $112,400 finish processing in the Mixing Department and are transferred to the Drying Department for further processing. E) Units with a carrying cost of $143,800 finish processing in the Drying Department, the final step in the production process, and are transferred to the finished goods warehouse. F) Finished goods with a carrying cost of $138,500

Required: Prepare journal entries to record items A) through F).

Solution (2):

–work in process-mixing department       $38,200
—raw materials                                     $38,200 
–work in process                         $36,500 
–salaries/wages payable                            $36,500 
–work in process-mixing department       $42,100 
–manufacturing overhead                            $42,100 
–work in process-drying department.      $112,400
–work in process mixing department                 $112,400
–finished goods                          $143,800 
–work in process-drying department                 $143,800 
-costs of goods sold                     $138,500
–finished goods                                    $138,500

== Operation cost in batch manufacturing ==
Batch costing is a modification of job costing. When production is repetitive nature and consists of a definite number of articles, batch is used. In batch costing, the most important problem is to determine the optimum size of the batch that follows the fact that production of two elements of costs:

- Set up costs which are generally fixed per batch.
- Carrying costs which determination of batch quantity requires considerations of some factors:
- setting up costs per batch.
- cost of manufacturing such as (direct materials cost + direct wages + direct overhead) per piece.
- cost of storage.
- rate of interest on the capital invested in product and rate of demand for product.
