= Revenue center =

Division that gains revenue from product sales or service provided

In business, a revenue center is a division that gains revenue from product sales or service provided. The manager in a revenue center is accountable for revenue only.

== Overview ==
A revenue center is one of the five divisions of a responsibility center – cost center, revenue center, profit center, contribution center and investment center. Cost centers, like revenue centers, only monitor costs, thereby making them a counterpart to the revenue center. Revenue centers only measure the output (in fiscal standings) and are therefore marketing establishments which are exempt from profit generation and accountability thereof. In a revenue center performance is measured by comparing actual sales to projected ones (as well as number of sales or revenue per time scale). Quota and budget comparisons are also used as a performance indicator.

A revenue center has costs, however to the manager of a revenue center this is of little importance as revenue is his sole performance indicator. Not all costs are ignored in a revenue center. For example, the manager of a revenue center is responsible for the expenses of his department (such as maintenance costs). In a sales office (the most widespread example of a revenue center), maintenance costs can be construed as rent, salaries, taxes and security. However, any costs related to product sale and manufacturing are not included in such expenses. A revenue center becomes a profit center if the latter is encompassed, thus making a profit center a blend of both a cost and revenue center.

In a revenue center the manager usually has control over issues regarding marketing and sales. This is delegated to him because both of the spheres require extensive knowledge that is explicit to the local market. However, the revenue center manager will not be given control over decision on quantity or product mix. If the manager is given control over these decisions problems can arise (see below).

Technological advancements have been able to reduce expenses in revenue centers as well as bring non-traditional (online) revenue centers to non-retail companies that work in manufacturing or service industries. This can be done by setting up websites which offer products directly from the supplier. This reduces cost by shortening the distribution channel and cuts out wholesalers and retailers.

== Problems ==
One of the biggest problems in a revenue center is that costs are mostly ignored. If costs are not monitored by another division of the business, profits can be hindered. Furthermore, the manager of a revenue center does not have the insight required for marketing decisions, consequently responsibility for a marketing decision cannot be given to a revenue center manager. Setting prices on products or services is an example of revenue center managers being unable to undertake marketing decisions.

It is easy to calculate the performance of a revenue center as revenue is the only variable being performed against. However, this means that performance evaluations are also limited to one variable, which is usually not enough to see the performance of a business division.

Pure revenue centers hardly exist. This is due to the fact that costs cannot be completely ignored. Usually (as stated above) revenue center managers control expenses.

Revenue center managers should not be allowed to make marketing decisions. For example, if a revenue center manager is allowed to set the revenue target, he will maximise revenue. This will cause the marginal revenue to become zero.

In large companies with multiple products, revenue centers will be responsible for meeting revenue target for each product. The problem will arise if all revenues are added together into a total of all products. The revenue manager will then be able to make up any losses in revenue by taking the revenue from the ones that outperformed the targets to the ones that underperformed, thereby causing a loss in overall profits.

Businesses may decide to open revenue centers when entering new markets or industries. The initial cost of these centers is high, and it is highly likely that a lot of time is required in order for those centers to become profitable and cover the start-up expenditures.

== Examples ==
The following is a list of some examples of revenue centers.

- Sales office
- Amazon's eCommerce department
- Hertz's national car reservation center
- In hotels:
  - Rooms division
  - Restaurants
  - Bars
  - Lounges
  - Banqueting facilities
  - Telephone
  - Gift shops
  - Valet parking
  - Laundry

== See also ==
- Responsibility center
- Cost centre
- Profit center
- Investment center
