= Strategic competitiveness =

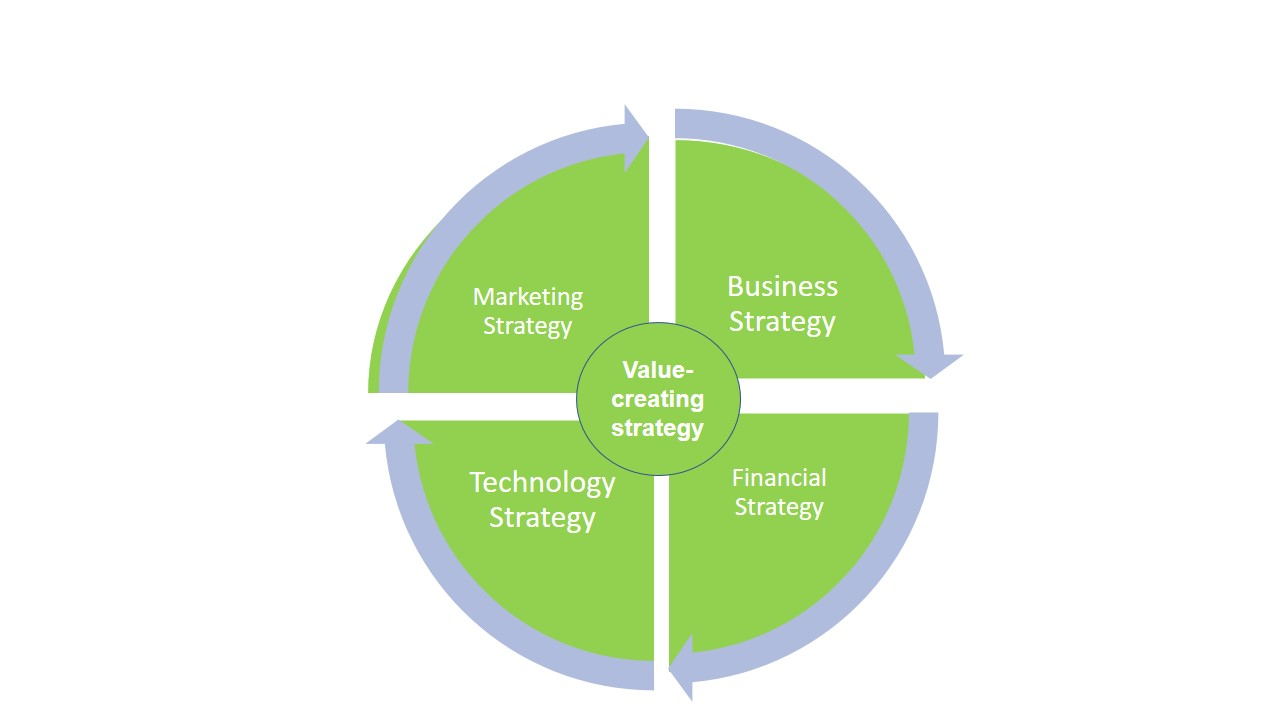
Value-creating strategy

Strategic competitiveness is accomplished when a firm successfully integrates a value-creating strategy. The key to having a complete value-creating strategy is to adopt a holistic approach that includes business strategy, financial strategy, technology strategy, marketing strategy and investor strategy. The objective of the firm has to be based on creating value in an efficient way because it is the starting point for all businesses and it will generate profit after cost. Eric Beinhocker, the Executive Director of the Institute for New Economic Thinking at the Oxford Martin School, University of Oxford, says in his book The Origin of Wealth that the origin of wealth is knowledge. Knowledge does not have to be perceived as an assumption, or as an external factor. It has to be in the heart of the business. For this reason, the value-creating strategy must include a thorough knowledge of each area of the company in order to develop a competitive advantage.

== Business strategy ==
In business strategy, it is important to distinguish strategic decisions which imply long-lasting commitments, from tactical decisions, which are short-term responses to the current environment. The strategic decisions define the evolution of state variables that provide a scenario in which current tactics are played out. For instance, investment in physical capital has a strategic role as the basis to determine the success of the enterprise in the future. A firm can gain an advantage by investing and creating a more dynamic behavior that in the future will lead its rivals to respond by competing less dynamically or by completely staying out of the market.

== Financial strategy ==
For both new and established businesses, it is essential to establish a strong and clear financial strategy that determines the guiding principles in all financial decisions. Financial decisions are of three types: the investment decision, the financing decision, and the dividend decision. Investment decisions cover capital investment and current investment. Financing decisions include targets for the ratios of debt to total capital and of total debt to total assets. Dividend decisions are concerned with dividend growth and dividend payout.

== Technology strategy ==
Technology implementation is often an important way to drive relative advantage over competitors, even among small businesses.

== Social media ==
Social networks such as Facebook, Twitter, Instagram, and LinkedIn are effective tools. Adopting an effective social media strategy can rapidly improve a company’s branding and visibility by facilitating the interaction with its customers. Social media sends direct messages and can attract many people to the company's website as long as its design and content are compatible with the quality of the strategy; otherwise, it will be difficult to retain the new public.

== New technologies ==
Nowadays, most private enterprises have adopted modern technology. They have created user-friendly websites, online catalogs, and call centers, and they have restructured inventory management. Nevertheless, there are still other important aspects of technology, mentioned by Forbes, that large business are adopting and that small businesses may also be able to adopt:

- Real-time, for marketing and product promotion.
- Online customer relationship management (CRM).
- Tablet-based systems for employees to provide instant, one-to-one responses to customers' needs.
- Subscription-based Software as a service (SaaS).

== Marketing strategy ==
An effective marketing strategy covers the "4 P's" of the marketing mix: Product, price, place, and promotion.

- Product: variety, design, quality, features, brand name, packaging, services
- Price: list price, discounts, allowance, payment period, credit terms
- Place: channels, coverage, assortments, locations, inventory, transportation, logistics
- Promotion: advertising, personal selling, sales promotion, public relations.

Nevertheless, these "4 P's" may be challenged by the "4 C's": Customer solution, customer cost, convenience, and communication.

- The customer looks for solutions to their problems when buying, not for products.
- The customer wants to know the total cost of acquiring, using and disposing of a product, not price.
- Customers want to purchase the products and services as soon as possible, not place.
- Communication, not promotion: Customers prefer personalized communication with the company rather than promotion.

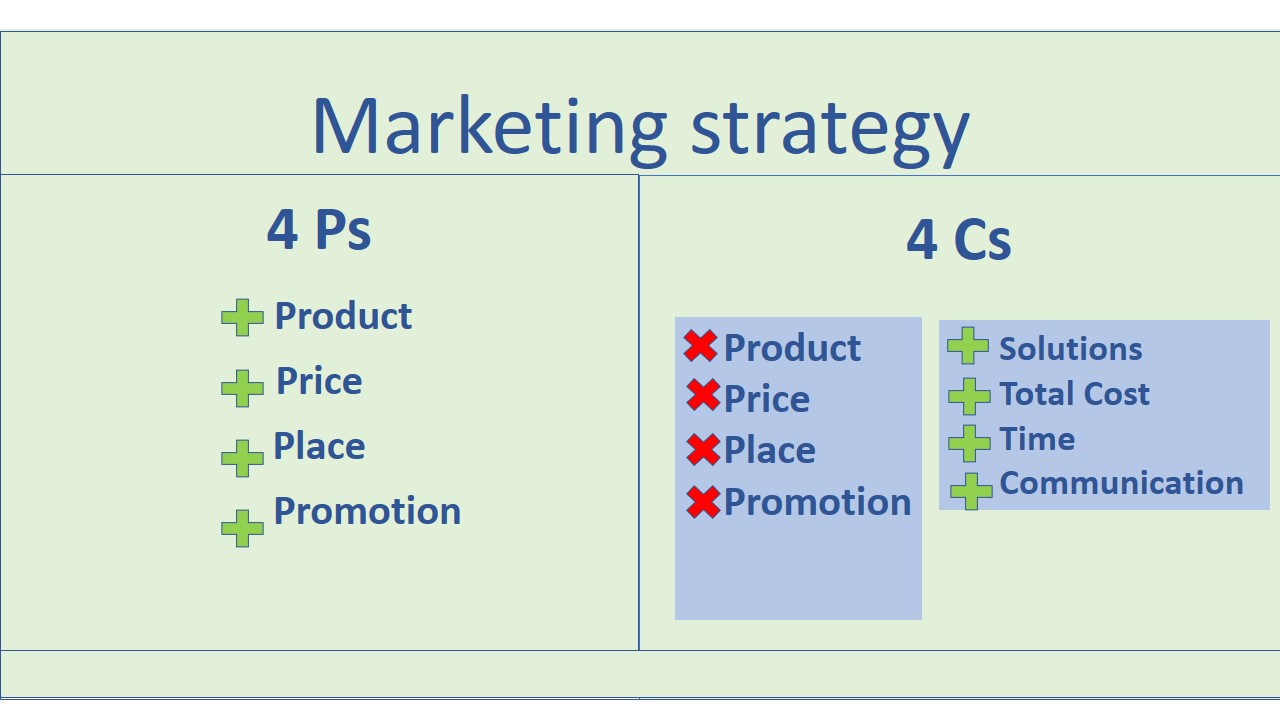
marketing strategy

== Process for choosing value-creating strategies ==
Value creation entails the integration of three different management activities: strategic management, which is focused on decisions; change management, which is about turning into new areas; and operations management, which is focused on results. These three activities are designed not only for choosing a good strategy but also for adapting to changes and creating new strategies. Successful firms are specialists in this subject. To achieve this value creation there has been created a six-step decision process that includes a dialogue between decision makers and the strategic team of the company.

- First step: Assess The Business Situation: the strategy team has to evaluate a business by analyzing its life cycle (Porter's five forces analysis), value chain and the formula for success of the company.
- Second step: Develop Alternatives, Information, and Value Tradeoffs: the firm creates three to seven more effective and feasible alternatives to meet new challenges.
- Third Step: Evaluate the Risk and Potential Return of the Alternative: the team strategy evaluates the alternatives they have chosen by measuring value, risk timing and other factors related to them.
- Fourth Step: Decide Among Alternatives: The decision board balances strategic and organizational implications along with the financial comparisons of alternatives.
- Fifth and Sixth Step: plan for Action and Implementation: Step 5 is about modifying the vision of the company after having chosen the new alternatives for the implementation and Step 6 is to implement the plan of action.

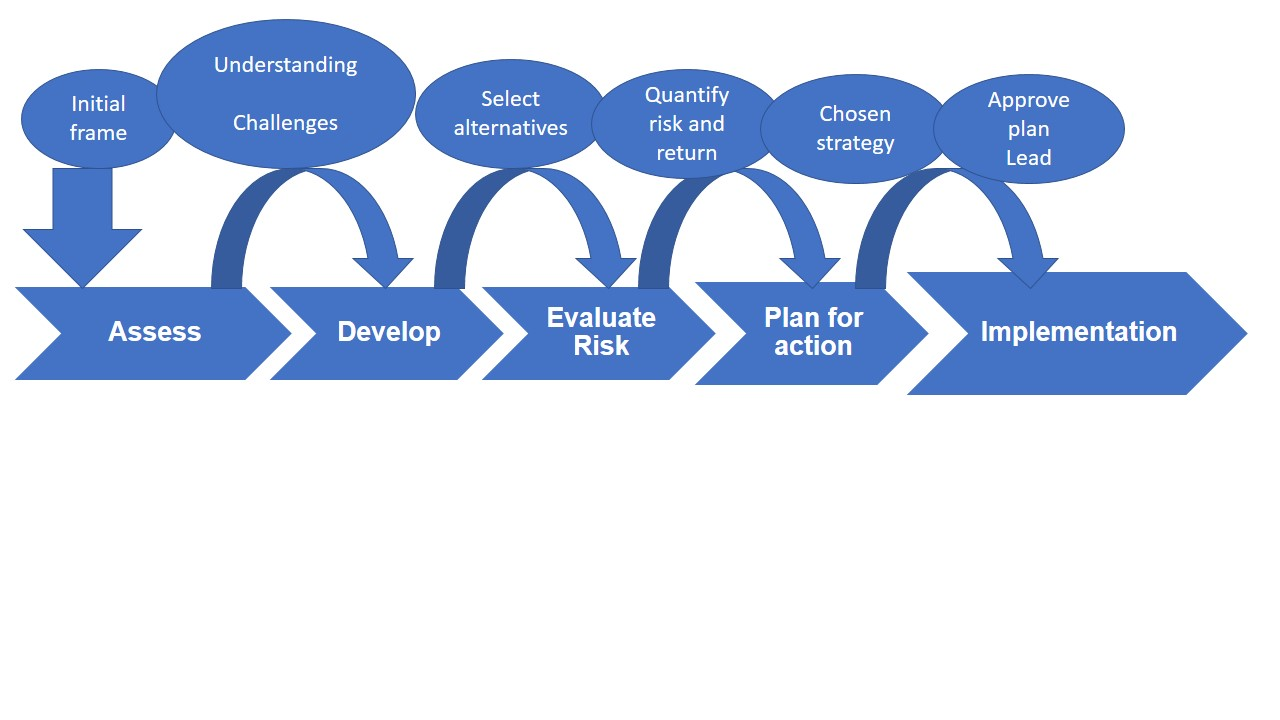
Process value-creating strategy

== Application ==
McDonald's has been a leader in its industry as one of the first fast food firms to enter global markets and it is now a global business. It is always adapting to changes. For example, its product line or brand-name varies between countries. In Australia, McDonald's is known as Mocca because Australians tend to abbreviate names in order to avoid pronouncing too many syllables. However, a recent study determined that its success is due to a factor that goes beyond these little details, and that is knowledge of their customers' preferences.

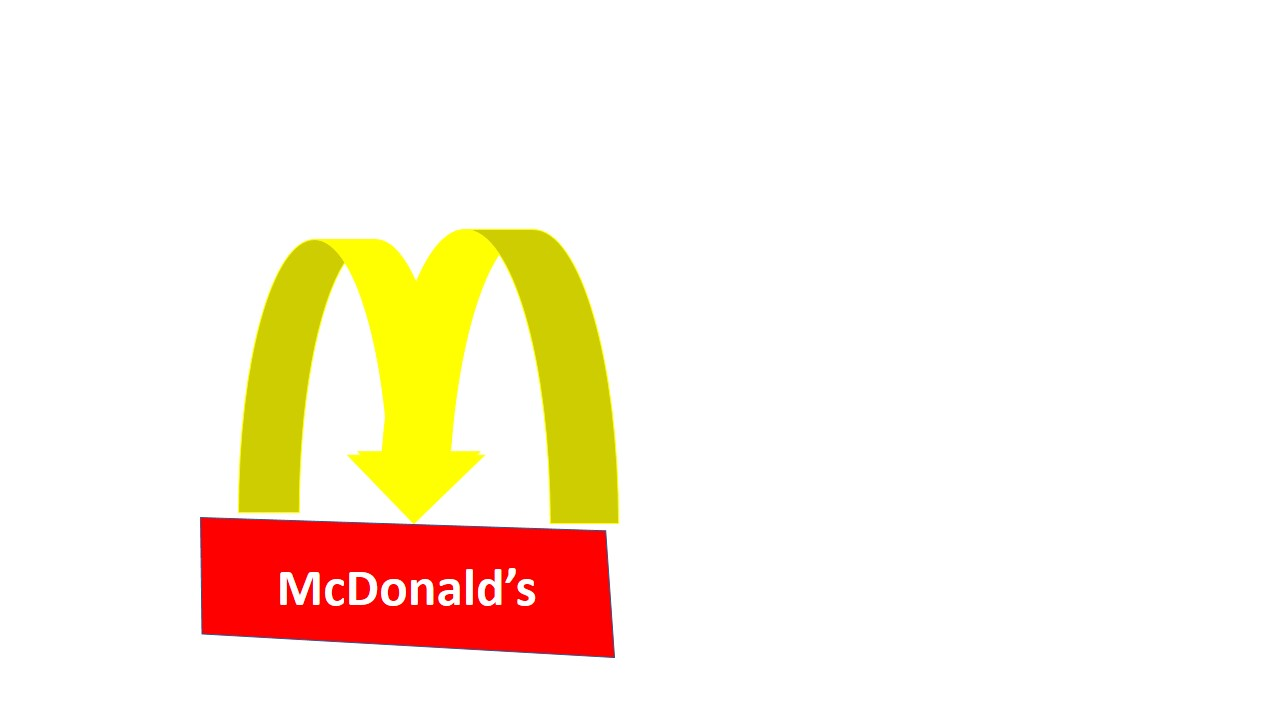
McDonald's Strategic Competitiveness

McDonald’s takes into account local tastes and preferences when developing its menu and developing a marketing strategy. The competitive advantage of McDonald's is composed of three main aspects: its prices, speed of service, and a universal taste. Its prices are affordable for most, and this is because this company is engaged in the extensive use of economies of scale so it can achieve a cost advantage. Then, it is known for its speed of service: no matter which meal the person orders, it always take the same time (3–5 minutes) to be served. Finally, a universal taste characterizes the McDonald's products line. For example, the Big Mac has the same taste almost all over the world and that provides security to those customers who travel a lot and do not like to try new food.
