= Cost allocation =

Principle in cost accounting

Cost allocation is a process of providing relief to shared service organization's cost centers that provide a product or service. In turn, the associated expense is assigned to internal clients' cost centers that consume the products and services. For example, the CIO may provide all IT services within the company and assign the costs back to the business units that consume each offering.

The core components of a cost allocation system consist of a way to track which organizations provides a product and/or service, the organizations that consume the products and/or services, and a list of portfolio offerings (e.g. service catalog). Depending on the operating structure within a company, the cost allocation data may generate an internal invoice or feed an ERP system's chargeback module. Accessing the data via an invoice or chargeback module are the typical methods that drive personnel behavior. In return, the consumption data becomes a great source of quantitative information to make better business decisions. Today’s organizations face growing pressure to control costs and enable responsible financial management of resources. In this environment, an organization is expected to provide services cost-effectively and deliver business value while operating under tight budgetary constraints. One way to contain costs is to implement a cost allocation methodology, where your business units become directly accountable for the services they consume.

An effective cost allocation methodology enables an organization to identify what services are being provided and what they cost, to allocate costs to business units, and to manage cost recovery. Under this model, both the service provider and its respective consumers become aware of their service requirements and usage and how they directly influence the costs incurred. This information, in turn, improves discipline within the business units and financial discipline across the entire organization. With the organization articulating the costs of services provided, the business units become empowered – and encouraged – to make informed decisions about the services and availability levels they request. They can make trade-offs between service levels and costs, and they can benchmark internal costs against outsourced providers.

== Types of Costs ==
Every organization must define their costs, like how funding runs through the organization, who touches it, what they do and how they do it serves as a foundation for this understanding. According to the Office of Management and Budget's (OMB) Uniform Guidance, there are only three types of costs – Indirect, Indirect-Admin (Overhead) and Direct. By correctly defining and allocating costs, true cost of service can be fully captured.

1. Direct costs - are those that can be associated specifically to a final cost objective. You know what you spend on programs. You know what expenses go directly to your mission. Most importantly, you know what expenses go directly to those benefitting from your service.
2. Indirect costs - are things that you need to do for the sake of the organizational health & operations, but don’t tie back to a specific program. For instance, the actual time (resources) that need to be dedicated when working with your Internet provider to fix the organization’s connection is important, but it ‘s unlikely that the time spent can be tied to one particular function in a program.
3. Indirect-Admin (Overhead) costs - are defined as those that are not Direct but are necessary for the immediate support of the program. Indirect-Admin costs or Overhead are very important to nonprofits since unlike government, they do not necessarily have separate buckets of funding. If Direct costs are the foundation, the Overhead costs are one touch away. So, when you are working on managing a program, leading those working for a program in their work or simply accounting for program expenses and revenues, you are only one touch away and are, in effect, performing direct activities. These activities can be attributed to your Direct Costs for purposes of expense reimbursement.

== See also ==
- Polluter pays principle
