= Cost to serve =

Acccountancy tool for calculating the business costs of serving each customer

Cost to Serve (CTS or C2S) is an accountancy and financial planning tool used to calculate the profitability of serving the needs of a particular customer account, based on the actual business activities and overhead costs incurred in servicing that customer or customer type. Businesses are able to reposition customers and services, and how they are served to improve overall margin. (Note: Cost-to-Serve is a registered trademark of LCP Consulting Ltd.)

Gartner's glossary defines the term as a form of analysis which

calculates the profitability of products, customers and routes to market, and provides a fact-based focus for decision making on service mix and operational changes for each customer.

The Australian Food and Grocery Council describes Cost to Serve (C2S) as

a generic label for a robust methodology to determine the likely financial outcomes of supply chain investment and collaborative engagement.

== Supply chain management ==
In the context of supply chain management the tool can be used to analyse how costs are consumed throughout the supply chain. It shows that each product and customer demands different activities and has a different cost profile. The product and customer profiles are often illustrated using a Pareto analysis curve which highlights those that contribute most to the company's profit and those that erode it.

Cost to Serve is considered less resource-intensive than Activity Based Costing (ABC) as it focuses on aggregate analyses around a blend of cost drivers. The tool gives an integrated view of costs at each stage of the supply chain, providing a fact-based view to unravel the complexity of multiple supply chains and channels to market. It enables a focus on both long-term decisions and the identification of easily-achieved process changes to improve profitability. Seifert and Markoff note that

Cost-To-Serve is one of those supply chain ideas that is so intuitive and the benefits so clear, yet in speaking to supply chain executives we have seen that in fact it is rarely applied in a sustainable, repeatable way.

== See also ==
- Pareto principle
- Activity based costing
- Supply chain management
