= EcoProIT =

EcoProIT is a project initiated at Chalmers University of Technology at the department of Product and Production Development. The project aims to provide production engineers a tool for detailed ecological footprint analyses, which are becoming more important in terms of marketing and legislation. A published report by MIT in 2011 showed companies thought that environmental sustainable strategy is, or will be, vital to be competitive. The report included many sectors, e.g. covering medicals, automobiles and consumer products. EcoProIT will design a tool for industrial applications used for detailed environmental footprint analyses of their production systems and the products produced using simulation. The tool will simulate the production and analyze the product's environmental footprint in a standardized way. It will also be possible to use the tool for bench marking between different sites. The aim for the tool puts high requirements on standardized methods and data management.

== Vision - Tool usage ==
The vision of the usage of EcoProIT is important. Company A, who is a big and important stakeholder, is the main user of the tool in Figure 1. They require their close supplier partner to use the same tool. Company A and supplier A and B then set up an internal connection of their tools. The connection makes the input information for Company A up to date for every use. Company A also sets up a connection to their close partners that buy or distribute Company A's products. It will then be possible to give a good estimation of the impact total specific distribution chain that will be up to data. The information can be used to inform the end users about total costs for the production data. The up to date chain gives a possibility to show the consumers that the company makes progress in lowering the environmental impact. Every improvement is delivered directly to the customers, and the new marketing possibility show what the production department is doing for the environment.

All information that is produced by the tool should be able to be uploaded to the central EcoProIT Database that stores it in a standardized way to be able to be used by other companies. The tool is also connected to other LCA databases to be able to use as input for the raw materials used in the production. Figure 1 shows a schematic view on how the system could be connected.

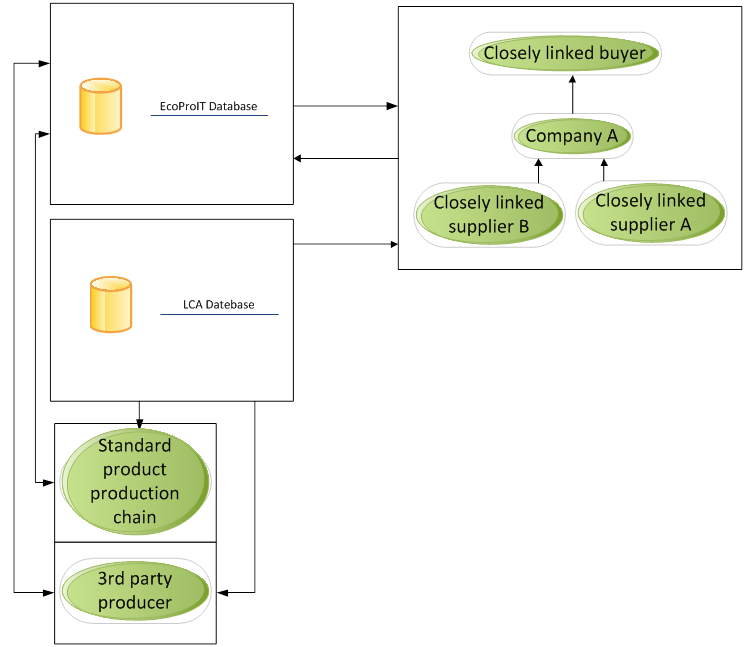
Figure 1: Concept map of the future use of the tool

== Environmental Activity-Based Costing ==
As an approach to calculation of the impact, activity-based costing (ABC) will be used for calculations of environmental costs. Emblemssvåg and Bras worked and analyzed the ABC as a method for environmental analyses. The method substitutes the cost for the production in money with an environmental emission, e.g. CO_{2} emissions. The emissions are measured and calculated from the energy and resources used. Then the emissions are allocated to the different products produced using the resources in the model.

The problems with ABC is that it requires a lot of data for a qualitative and accurate allocation of the cost from the resources. This is why the method fits well into a DES model. During a run In a DES environment it is easy to grab lot of detailed results needed for accurate allocation. The problem is that DES require a lot of initial effort to build the model. The approach to analyze environmental impact in a DES model is only beneficial if there is requirements for detailed analyzes and “what-if” scenarios is needed.

== Hierarchically modeling approach ==
When LCA is included in a production simulation model, there is a bigger need for output information to perform the calculations. To be able to allocate environmental load that origins from the facilities the product that used the facility need to be traced. Environmental load that origin form the maintenance needs to be allocated based on the machines use of the maintenance. Machines that use other resources as compressed air or other supporting machines needs to be associated to trace the usage of those resources to be able to allocate the environmental load to the products that used the machine.

Andersson, J et al. (2012) proposed to model the machines and resources in a hierarchy. The approach is based on that all product types have attributes with weight and size. The attributes is used together with the time the product has been in each resources to allocate the environmental load to all products using the resource at the same time. A product that is using a machine is also using the machines and facilities in the upper hierarchy. The approach supports increasingly detailed modeling. The modeler increase the level of detail by model each box in greater detail in a lower lever in the hierarchy. The modeler can in other nodes stay at a brief level with less dynamics.

== Verification/Validation Strategies ==
Environmental impact is in general hard to validate. To be able to trust the models is very important that the models are transparent and provide multiple levels of verification. The strategy here is to not calculate everything in the simulation model and instead provide results, which can be verified, to calculate the used resources from. E.g. from the amount of processing time for a machine it is possible to calculate the used energy. From the used resources upstream processes required to produce the resources can be included to get a total emission for the production, e.g. if the emissions to produce one kWh electricity is 0.1 kgCO_{2} then the 4 kWh electricity used in a machine give an emission of 0.4 kgCO_{2}. The concept is called Level of Equation. The basis is to divide the calculations of environmental impact into 4 levels

- Process times, lead times, idle times, setup times, etc.
- Consumption of resources e.g. Electricity, steal, oil, etc.
- Emissions
- Environmental impact, e.g. [GWP]

== Sponsors ==
The main sponsor for the project is ProViking accompanied by a few big industrial partners.
