= Cockroach (startup) =

Type of business that grows gradually

A cockroach is a business that – from inception forward – grows gradually and progressively. It puts a specific emphasis on revenues as well as profits, and ensures a tight cost control to make its growth especially robust as far as finances are concerned. Oftentimes, these cockroaches are considered more resilient, and thus are a less risky investment than "unicorns".
