= Momentem =

Momentem is a call, time and expense management service for smartphones.

Momentem is mobile expense management software that is a combination of downloadable software on a smartphone and a managed service. Users of Momentem tag mobile calls and log activities with their smartphone. As a result they have a better understanding as to what their mobile calls and usage were used for when they compare Momentem’s reports to their phone bills. Each call and tagged activity gets allocated to the user’s customers and projects. Momentem’s system and corresponding customer management web portal generates spreadsheets that allows users to recover more phone costs, and save time with administrative tasks.

Momentem empowers users to flag calls as billable time and cost, and type notes about the call for follow-up or an audit trail. Users can also generate on-demand reports of their tagged activities directly from the handset; a summary appears on the screen and a detailed report is sent to them via email in Excel format which is more detailed and usable than a typical mobile phone bill. These reports allow users to generate bills and expense claims to their employers or customers for their time and cost.

The concept of "call tagging", i.e. allocating meaningful context and information to mobile calls, is brand new to the wireless industry. There are hundreds of examples of the benefits people get by applying tags to their calls, at https://web.archive.org/web/20091009184233/http://www.momentem.net/comments/
