= Cost driver =

Part of an activity that causes the change in its cost

A cost driver is a structural factor which determines the cost of an activity or a change in its cost. The Chartered Institute of Management Accountants defines a cost driver as:

[A] cost driver is any factor which causes a change in the cost of an activity,

although a different meaning is assigned to the term by the business writer Michael Porter, who states:

"cost drivers are the structural determinants of the cost of an activity, reflecting any linkages or interrelationships that affect it".

== Approaches ==
Porter's approach defines a "cost driver" not just as a simple variable in a function, but as something that changes the function itself. For example, the driver "economy of scale" leads to different costs per unit for different scales of operation (a small cargo vessel is more expensive per unit than a large bulk carrier), and the driver "capacity utilisation" leads to greater costs per unit if the capacity is under-utilised and lower costs per unit is the utilisation is high. In general, the cost driver for short term indirect variable costs may be the volume of output/activity; but for long term indirect variable costs, the cost drivers will not be related to volume of output/activity.

The Activity Based Costing (ABC) approach relates indirect cost to the activities that drive them to be incurred. Activity Based Costing is based on the belief that activities cause costs and therefore a link should be established between activities and product. The cost drivers thus are the link between the activities and the cost of the product. To carry out a value chain analysis, ABC is a necessary tool. To carry out ABC, it is necessary that cost drivers are established for different cost pools.

In traditional costing the cost driver to allocate indirect cost to cost objects was volume of output. With the change in business structures, technology and thereby cost structures it was found that the volume of output was not the only cost driver. John Shank and Vijay Govindarajan divide cost drivers into two categories:

- structural cost drivers, which are derived from a business's strategic choices about its underlying economic structure such as scale and scope of operations, complexity of products, use of technology, etc., and
- executional cost drivers, which are derived from the execution of business activities such as capacity utilization, plant layout, work-force involvement, etc.

Resource cost Driver is a measure of the quantity of resources consumed by an activity. It is used to assign cost of a resource to activity or cost pool.

Activity Cost Driver is a measure of the frequency and intensity of demand placed on activities by cost object. It is used to assign activity costs to cost objects.

== Examples ==
If more people eat in a restaurant, the catering cost will increase, although revenue will also increase.

Some examples of indirect costs and their drivers are: indirect costs for maintenance, with the possible driver of this cost being the number of machine hours; or the indirect cost of handling raw-material cost, which may be driven by the number of orders received; or inspection costs that are driven by the number of inspections or the hours of inspection or production runs. In marketing, cost drivers include the number of advertisements, number of sales personnel etc. In customer service, cost drivers include the number of service calls attended, number of staff in service department, number of warranties handled, hours spent on servicing etc..

== See also ==
- Activity-based costing
- Fixed cost
- Variable cost
- Value chain
