= Profit center =

Business division expected to make identifiable profits

A profit center is a part of a business which is expected to make an identifiable contribution to the organization's profits.

== Overview ==
A profit center is a section of a company treated as a separate business. Thus profits or losses for a profit center are calculated separately.

A profit center manager is held accountable for both revenue and costs (expenses), and therefore for profits. This means that the manager is accountable for driving the sales revenue generating activities which lead to cash inflows and at the same time controlling the cost-generating activities. This makes the profit center management more challenging than cost center management. Profit center management is equivalent to running an independent business because a profit center business unit or department is treated as a distinct entity enabling revenues and expenses to be determined and its profitability to be measured.

Business organizations may be organized in terms of profit centers where the profit center's revenues and expenses are held separate from the main company's in order to determine their profitability. Usually different profit centers are separated for accounting purposes so that the management can follow how much profit each center makes and compare their relative efficiency and profit. Examples of typical profit centers are a store, a sales organization and a consulting organization whose profitability can be measured.

Peter Drucker originally coined the term profit center around 1945. He later recanted, calling it "One of the biggest mistakes I have made". He subsequently asserted that there are only cost centers within a business, and “the only profit center is a customer whose cheque hasn’t bounced”.

== See also ==
- Cost centre
- Revenue center
- Investment center
- Responsibility center
