= Expense management =

Expense management is a computer system to process, pay, and audit expenses of an organization's employees. These costs include, but are not limited to, expenses incurred for travel and entertainment. Expense management includes the policies and procedures that govern such spending, as well as the technologies and services utilized to process and analyze the data associated with it.

Software to manage the expense claim, authorization, audit and repayment processes can be obtained from organizations that provide a licensed software, implementation and support service, or alternatively, from software as a service (SaaS) providers. SaaS providers offer on-demand web-based applications managed by a third party to improve the productivity of expense management.

== Steps ==
Expense management automation has two aspects: the process an employee follows in order to complete an expense claim (for example, logging a hotel receipt or submitting mobile phone records) and the activity accounts or finance staff undertake to process the claim within the finance system.

Typically, a manual process will involve an employee completing a paper, spreadsheet, or graphical user interface-based expense report that they then forward, along with the relevant tax invoices (receipts), to a manager or other controller for approval. Once the manager has approved the claim, they forward it on to the accounts department for processing. The accounts staff then key each expense item into the company's finance system before filing the claim and receipts away. In a Software as a Service implementation, these processes are largely automated and the submission and approvals processes are transacted electronically.

Expense Management automation is the means by which an organization can significantly reduce transaction costs and improve management control when logging, calculating and processing corporate expenses. Independent research evaluating the use of automated expense management systems has confirmed that the cost of processing an expense claim is reduced as the level of automation increases.

Organizations may automate their expense management processes for reasons such as compliance, cost reduction, control, and employee productivity.

== Types ==
Business strategies are tailored to various types of expense management:

- Spreadsheets: Spreadsheets can be an easy, cheap way to keep track of expenses, but they still have paper receipts that go along with them that can be lost or damaged. This can also be a labor-intensive method and it can be confusing if employees are not good at using spreadsheets.
- Paper forms: Paper forms work well with paper receipts. This is also an inexpensive way to manage expense reports. However, this can amount to a lot of manual work of logging and tracking these reports for both employees, approvers, and the people who need to pay the bills in the accounting department.
- Software: Software reduces the workload, but it also can cost more in the beginning to implement. According to the Aberdeen Group's report, "Best-In-Class T&E Expense Management: How They Do It," software can solve the major problems of compliance, manual labor, approval time, and the cost of expense reporting overall.

=== Telecom expense management ===
Telecom Expense Management (TEM) is the process of managing large enterprises communications costs to include fixed voice and data, mobile devices, Unified Communications and Collaboration (UCC), VoIP, and any other IT related services. The management of wireless and wireline service and asset expenses is labeled as Telecom expense management. Historically, Telecom expenses were managed as general services. In recent years, more and more organizations associate telecom expense to IT services. This change in management is due to a shift in global business strategies towards evolving technologies.

=== Travel expense management ===
Travel expense management (often referred to as "T+E") is defined as the means to organize and manage travel arrangements and costs for traveling employee.In recent years, artificial intelligence (AI) has enhanced corporate travel expense management by enabling automated expense capture, real-time policy compliance checks, fraud detection, predictive spend analysis, and improved cost control through data-driven insights. A number of software providers offer corporate travel and expense (T&E) management solutions, including platforms such as Coupa, Ramp, Zoho Expense, Dice and Zaggle.

=== Technology expense management ===
Technology expense management or IT expense management is the management of technology costs such as software licenses, computer equipment, applications, etc. Technology expense management also includes the management of services related to technology (SaaS, PaaS, etc.). Technology expense management activities are often performed through the use of various technology tools (bill of IT, management software, workflows, etc.).

== See also ==
- Corporate travel management
