= Cost pool =

Accounting term

Cost pools is an accounting term that refers to groups of accounts serving to express the cost of goods and service allocatable within a business or manufacturing organization. The principle behind the pool is to correlate direct and indirect costs with a specified cost driver, so to find out the total sum of expenses related to the manufacture of a product.

While the exact construction cost pools differs, most companies choose to form numerical based sequences that can then be allocated to the desired project. More frequently, a single cost pool will have up to ten digits in the sequence, with certain groups of those digits used to relate back to the project or something else. Cost pool accounts consists of ten digits. The first three digits of the cost pool categorize a particular branches, the next three assign the project itown, and the final four digits assign a specific sub-group of expenses of the project, such as clerical costs. Cost pools consists of overhead costs administrative costs.

== Cost driver ==
A cost driver is the unit of an activity that causes the change in activity's cost. It is used to assign overhead costs to the number of units produced.

== Indirect costs ==
Some examples of indirect costs are accounting and legal expenses, administrative salaries, office expenses, rent expenses, depreciation, insurance expenses, and utility expenses. All of which are also known as fixed costs or period costs.

== Direct costs ==
Some examples of direct Costs are direct labor, direct materials, commissions, piece rate wages, consumable supplies, freight in and out, and manufacturing supplies. All of these costs are variable costs.
