= Investment center =

Classification used for business units within an enterprise

An investment center is a classification used for business units within an enterprise. The essential element of an investment center is that it is treated as a unit which is measured against its use of capital, as opposed to a cost or profit center, which are measured against raw costs or profits.

The Investment Center takes care of Revenues, Cost and Assets, while a Profit Center deals with revenues and costs and Cost Centers with costs only. This is a clear sign of how the span of control and span of accountability grow from Cost Centers to Investment ones.

The advantage of this form of measurement is that it tends to be more encompassing, since it accounts for all uses of capital. It is susceptible to manipulation by managers with a short term focus, or by manipulating the hurdle rate used to evaluate divisions.

== See also ==
- Cost center
- Profit center
