= Direct labor cost =

Direct labor cost is the part of labor cost (payroll costs) that is used directly in the production of goods, performance of a particular work order, or provision of a service.

== Determination of the direct labor cost ==
Direct labor cost may be determined by:

- Planning the work to be performed.
- Describing the skill requirements of each task.
- Matching tasks to employees.
- Determining the labor burden per hour and job time required for each task.

== Usage ==
In manufacturing, the direct labor cost is part of the manufacturing cost per item and scales proportionally to the number of items produced. This is in contrast to indirect labor cost, (for example, supervisory staff), which is not directly proportional to manufacturing costs and is considered an overhead expense.

== Calculation of direct labor cost ==
The direct labor cost may be calculated as the product of working time and employee total cost, inclusive of wages and benefits.

  
    
      
        
          Direct labor cost
        
        =
        
          job time
        
        ×
        
          (wage rate + benefits cost)
        
      
    
    {\displaystyle {\text{Direct labor cost}}={\text{job time}}\times {\text{(wage rate + benefits cost)}}}
  

Depending on the context, labor burden may be calculated on an hourly, daily, or other basis.

== Calculating job time ==
The job time may be measured via one of the following methods:

1. time study
2. work sampling
3. Predetermined motion time system

== See also ==
- Freight rate
- Job costing
- Labor burden
- Wage
- Workforce productivity
