= Bill of IT =

Bill of IT is an exhaustive list of information technology assets and services owned by a company. The bill displays a breakdown of all the IT assets and services in relation to various items. The bill is often used by companies as a chargeback and showback tool because it shows the relation between specific service/asset and employee, cost center, department, location, line of business, etc. It allows companies to see what they own and how their resources are allocated in the organizations. Most bills of IT show the following element (among other details):

- Cost - What each asset/service cost (price per unit);
- Price - The price of each service/asset multiply by the quantity of service/asset (predefined unit rate);
- Budget -The full budget (cost) associated with the use of this service/asset for a year or any chosen reporting period;
- Quality - The quality of the service/asset is shown through various metrics: uptime, response time (with support, etc);
- Benchmarking - Comparison of this service/asset to the company’s benchmarks (use, efficiency, etc.);

Ultimately, the goal of a bill of IT is to clarify IT investments in an organization by presenting a detailed view of IT expenses.
