= Labor burden =

Actual cost of a company to have an employee

Labor burden is the actual cost of a company to have an employee, in addition to wages that the employee earns. Labor burden costs include benefits that a company pays for employees that are included on their payroll, including payroll taxes, pension costs, workers compensation, health and dental insurance, and the cost of any other benefits that a company provides an employee.

Fully-burdened costs for individual employees can be expressed as a yearly total to provide an estimate of how much the company will spend that year on an employee. It can also be expressed as an hourly cost by dividing the total yearly cost by the number of hours the employee will work.

== See also ==
- Direct labor cost
- Overhead (business)
- Wage
