= Activity-based management =

Activity-based management (ABM) is a method of identifying and evaluating activities that a business performs, using activity-based costing to carry out a value chain analysis or a re-engineering initiative to improve strategic and operational decisions in an organization.

== Activity-based costing ==
Activity-based costing establishes relationships between overhead costs and activities so that costs can be more precisely allocated to products, services, or customer segments.

Activity-based management focuses on managing activities to reduce costs and improve customer value. Kaplan and Cooper divide ABM into operational and strategic:

- Operational ABM is about doing things right, using ABC information to improve efficiency. Those activities which add value to the product can be identified and improved. Activities that don't add value need to be reduced to cut costs without reducing product value.
- Strategic ABM is about doing the right things, using ABC information to decide which products to develop and which activities to use. This can also be used for customer profitability analysis, identifying which customers are the most profitable and focusing on them more.

One of the key benefits for the use of ABM is how it enables managers to understand product and customer profitability, the cost business processes and how to improve them (Alireza 2017).

== Risks ==
A risk with ABM is that some activities have an implicit value, not necessarily reflected in a financial value added to any product. For instance, a particularly pleasant workplace can help attract and retain the best staff, but may not be identified as adding value in operational ABM. A customer who represents a loss based on committed activities, but who opens up leads in a new market, may be identified as a low value customer by a strategic ABM process.

Managers should interpret these values and use ABM as a "common, yet neutral, ground … this provides the basis for negotiation". ABM can give middle managers an understanding of costs to other teams to help them make decisions that benefit the whole organization, not just their activities' bottom line.
