= Kaizen costing =

Cost reduction system

Kaizen costing is a cost reduction system used a product's design has been completed and it is in production. Business professor Yasuhiro Monden defines kaizen costing as

The maintenance of present cost levels for products currently being manufactured via systematic efforts to achieve the desired cost level.

The Shogakukan Dictionary's original definition of Kaizen is translated as “The act of making bad points better”. In English, the more popular definition of Kaizen is “Change for Better.” Many believe that the meaning of Kaizen is “continuous improvement,” but Kaizen is a result of continuous improvement. It exists at the employee level. The employee's goal is to reach their full potential, challenge the status quo and achieve continual improvement.

Prior to kaizen costing, when the products are in the development phase, target costing is applied. After targets have been set, they are continuously updated to display past improvements and the projected (expected) improvements.

Monden has described two types of kaizen costing:

- Asset and organization-specific kaizen costing activities planned according to the exigencies of each deal
- Product model-specific costing activities carried out in special projects with added emphasis on value analysis

Adopting kaizen costing requires a change in the method of setting standards.

Kaizen costing focuses on "cost reduction" rather than "cost control".

== Types of cost under consideration ==
Kaizen costing takes into consideration costs related to the manufacturing stage, which include:

- Costs of supply chain
- Legal costs
- Manufacturing costs
- Waste
- Recruitment costs
- Marketing, sales and distribution
- Product disposal
