= Activity-based costing =

Method of apportioning costs

Activity-based costing (ABC) is a costing method that identifies activities in an organization and assigns the cost of each activity to all products and services according to the actual consumption by each. Therefore, this model assigns more indirect costs (overhead) into direct costs compared to conventional costing.

The UK's Chartered Institute of Management Accountants (CIMA), defines ABC as an approach to the costing and monitoring of activities which involves tracing resource consumption and costing final outputs. Resources are assigned to activities, and activities to cost objects based on consumption estimates. The latter utilize cost drivers to attach activity costs to outputs.

The Institute of Cost Accountants of India says, ABC systems calculate the costs of individual activities and assign costs to cost objects such as products and services on the basis of the activities undertaken to produce each product or services. It accurately identifies sources of profit and loss.

The Institute of Cost & Management Accountants of Bangladesh (ICMAB) defines activity-based costing as an accounting method which identifies the activities which a firm performs and then assigns indirect costs to cost objects.

== Objectives ==
With ABC, a company can soundly estimate the cost elements of entire products, activities and services, that may help inform a company's decision to either:

- Identify and eliminate those products and services that are unprofitable and lower the prices of those that are overpriced (product and service portfolio aim), or
- Identify and eliminate production or service processes which are ineffective, and allocate processing concepts that lead to the very same product at a better yield (process re-engineering aim)

In a business organization, the ABC methodology assigns an organization's resource costs through activities to the products and services provided to its customers. ABC is generally used as a tool for understanding product and customer cost and profitability based on the production or performing processes. As such, ABC has predominantly been used to support strategic decisions such as pricing, outsourcing, identification and measurement of process improvement initiatives.

== Prevalence ==
Following strong initial uptake, ABC lost ground in the 1990s compared to alternative metrics, such as Kaplan's balanced scorecard and economic value added. An independent 2008 report concluded that manually driven ABC was an inefficient use of resources: it was expensive and difficult to implement for small gains, and a poor value, and that alternative methods should be used. Other reports show the broad band covered with the ABC methodology.

However, application of an activity based recording may be applied as an addition to activity based accounting, not as a replacement of any costing model, but to transform concurrent process accounting into a more authentic approach.

=== Historical development ===
Traditionally, cost accountants had arbitrarily added a broad percentage of analysis into the indirect cost. In addition, activities include actions that are performed both by people and machine.

However, as the percentages of indirect or overhead costs rose, this technique became increasingly inaccurate, because indirect costs were not caused equally by all products. For example, one product might take more time in one expensive machine than another product—but since the amount of direct labor and materials might be the same, additional cost for use of the machine is not being recognized when the same broad 'on-cost' percentage is added to all products. Consequently, when multiple products share common costs, there is a danger of one product subsidizing another.

ABC is based on George Staubus' Activity Costing and Input-Output Accounting. The concepts of ABC were developed in the manufacturing sector of the United States during the 1970s and 1980s. During this time, the Consortium for Advanced Management-International, now known simply as CAM-I, provided a formative role for studying and formalizing the principles that have become more formally known as Activity-Based Costing.

Robin Cooper and Robert S. Kaplan, proponents of the Balanced Scorecard, brought notice to these concepts in a number of articles published in Harvard Business Review beginning in 1988. Cooper and Kaplan described ABC as an approach to solve the problems of traditional cost management systems. These traditional costing systems are often unable to determine accurately the actual costs of production and of the costs of related services. Consequently, managers were making decisions based on inaccurate data especially where there are multiple products.

Instead of using broad arbitrary percentages to allocate costs, ABC seeks to identify cause and effect relationships to objectively assign costs. Once costs of the activities have been identified, the cost of each activity is attributed to each product to the extent that the product uses the activity. In this way, ABC often identifies areas of high overhead costs per unit and so directs attention to finding ways to reduce the costs or to charge more for more costly products.

Activity-based costing was first clearly defined in 1987 by Robert S. Kaplan and William J. Bruns as a chapter in their book Accounting and Management: A Field Study Perspective. They initially focused on manufacturing industry where increasing technology and productivity improvements have reduced the relative proportion of the direct costs of labor and materials, but have increased relative proportion of indirect costs. For example, increased automation has reduced labor, which is a direct cost, but has increased depreciation, which is an indirect cost.

Like manufacturing industries, financial institutions have diverse products and customers, which can cause cross-product, cross-customer subsidies. Since personnel expenses represent the largest single component of non-interest expense in financial institutions, these costs must also be attributed more accurately to products and customers. Activity based costing, even though originally developed for manufacturing, may even be a more useful tool for doing this.

Activity-based costing was later explained in 1999 by Peter F. Drucker in the book Management Challenges of the 21st Century. He states that traditional cost accounting focuses on what it costs to do something, for example, to cut a screw thread; activity-based costing also records the cost of not doing, such as the cost of waiting for a needed part. Activity-based costing records the costs that traditional cost accounting does not do.

The overhead costs assigned to each activity comprise an activity cost pool.

From a historical perspective, the practices systematized by ABC were first demonstrated by Frederick W. Taylor in The Principles of Scientific Management in 1911. Those were the basis of the famous time and motion studies that predated the later work by Walter A. Shewhart and W. Edwards Deming. Kaplan's work tied this earlier work to the modern practice of accounting.

== Alternatives ==
Lean accounting methods have been developed in recent years to provide relevant and thorough accounting, control, and measurement systems without the complex and costly methods of manually driven ABC.

Lean accounting is primarily used within lean manufacturing. The approach has proven useful in many service industry areas including healthcare, construction, financial services, governments, and other industries.

Application of Theory of constraints (TOC) is analysed in a study showing interesting aspects of productive coexistence of TOC and ABC application. Identifying cost drivers in ABC is described as somewhat equivalent to identifying bottlenecks in TOC. However the more thorough insight into cost composition for the inspected processes justifies the study result: ABC may deliver a better structured analysis in respect to complex processes, and this is no surprise regarding the necessarily spent effort for detailed ABC reporting.

== Methodology ==
Methodology of ABC focuses on cost allocation in operational management. ABC helps to segregate

- Fixed cost
- Variable cost
- Overhead cost

If achieved, the split of cost helps to identify cost drivers. Direct labour and materials are relatively easy to trace directly to products, but it is more difficult to directly allocate indirect costs to products. Where products use common resources differently, some sort of weighting is needed in the cost allocation process. The cost driver is a factor that creates or drives the cost of the activity. For example, the cost of the activity of bank tellers can be ascribed to each product by measuring how long each product's transactions (cost driver) take at the counter and then by measuring the number of each type of transaction. For the activity of running machinery, the driver is likely to be machine operating hours, looking at labor, maintenance, and power cost during the period of machinery activity.

== Application ==
ABC has proven its applicability beyond academic discussion.

ABC

- is applicable throughout company financing, costing and accounting.
- is a modeling process applicable for full scope as well as for partial views.
- helps to identify inefficient products, departments and activities.
- helps to allocate more resources on profitable products, departments and activities.
- helps to control the costs at any per-product level and on a departmental level.
- helps to find unnecessary costs that may be eliminated.
- helps fixing the price of a product or service with any desired analytical resolution.

A report summarizes reasons for implementing ABC as mere unspecific and mainly for case study purposes (in alphabetical order):

- Better Management
- Budgeting, performance measurement
- Calculating costs more accurately
- Ensuring product /customer profitability
- Evaluating and justifying investments in new technologies
- Improving product quality via better product and process design
- Increasing competitiveness or coping with more competition
- Management
- Managing costs
- Providing behavioral incentives by creating cost consciousness among employees
- Responding to an increase in overheads
- Responding to increased pressure from regulators
- Supporting other management innovations such as TQM and JIT systems

Beyond such selective application of the concept, ABC may be extended to accounting, hence proliferating a full scope of cost generation in departments or along product manufacturing. Such extension, however requires a degree of automatic data capture that prevents from cost increase in administering costs.

== Implementation ==
According to Manivannan Senthil Velmurugan, Activity-based costing must be implemented in the following ways:

1. Identify and assess ABC needs - Determine viability of ABC method within an organization.
2. Training requirements - Basic training for all employees and workshop sessions for senior managers.
3. Define the project scope - Evaluate mission and objectives for the project.
4. Identify activities and drivers - Determine what drives what activity.
5. Create a cost and operational flow diagram – How resources and activities are related to products and services.
6. Collect data – Collecting data where the diagram shows operational relationship.
7. Build a software model, validate and reconcile.
8. Interpret results and prepare management reports.
9. Integrate data collection and reporting.

=== Public sector usage ===
When ABC is reportedly used in the public administration sector, the reported studies do not provide evidence about the success of methodology beyond justification of budgeting practise and existing service management and strategies.

Usage in the US Marine Corps started in 1999.

Use of ABC by the UK Police has been mandated since the 2003-04 UK tax year as part of England and Wales' National Policing Plan, specifically the Policing Performance Assessment Framework.

== Limitations ==
Applicability of ABC is bound to cost of required data capture. That drives the prevalence to slow processes in services and administrations, where staff time consumed per task defines a dominant portion of cost. Hence the reported application for production tasks do not appear as a favorized scenario.

=== Treating fixed costs as variable ===
The potential problem with ABC, like other cost allocation approaches, is that it essentially treats fixed costs as if they were variable. This can, without proper understanding, give some people an inaccurate understanding which can then lead to poor decision making. For example, allocating PPE to individual products, may lead to discontinuation of products that seem unprofitable after the allocation, even if in fact their discontinuation will negatively affect the bottom line.

=== Tracing costs ===
Even in ABC, some overhead costs are difficult to assign to products and customers, such as the chief executive's salary. These costs are termed 'business sustaining' and are not assigned to products and customers because there is no meaningful method. This lump of unallocated overhead costs must nevertheless be met by contributions from each of the products, but it is not as large as the overhead costs before ABC is employed.

Although some may argue that costs untraceable to activities should be "arbitrarily allocated" to products, it is important to realize that the only purpose of ABC is to provide information to management. Therefore, there is no reason to assign any cost in an arbitrary manner.

=== Transition to automated activity-based costing accounting ===
The prerequisite for lesser cost in performing ABC is automating the data capture with an accounting extension that leads to the desired ABC model. Known approaches for event based accounting simply show the method for automation. Any transition of a current process from one stage to the next may be detected as a relevant event. Paired events easily form the respective activity.

The state of the art approach with authentication and authorization in IETF standard RADIUS gives an easy solution for accounting all workposition based activities. That simply defines the extension of the Authentication and Authorization (AA) concept to a more advanced AA and Accounting (AAA) concept. Respective approaches for AAA get defined and staffed in the context of mobile services, when using smart phones as e.a. intelligent agents or smart agents for automated capture of accounting data .
