= Fixed-asset turnover =

Fixed-asset turnover is the ratio of sales (on the profit and loss account) to the value of fixed assets (on the balance sheet). It indicates how well the business is using its fixed assets to generate sales.

$\text{Fixed Asset Turnover} = \frac{\text{Net sales}}{\text{Average net fixed assets}}$

Generally speaking, the higher the ratio, the better, because a high ratio indicates the business has less money tied up in fixed assets for each unit of currency of sales revenue. A declining ratio may indicate that the business is over-invested in plant, equipment, or other fixed assets.

In A.A.T. assessments this financial measure is calculated in two different ways.

1. Total Asset Turnover Ratio = Revenue / Total Assets

2. Net Asset Turnover Ratio = Revenue / (Total Assets - Current Liabilities)
