= Cost benchmarking =

Cost benchmarking is the measurement, refinement and analysis of one's Cost of Goods Sold (COGS) when compared to market peers. Cost benchmarking identifies competitiveness of pricing in industry terms, highlighting best in class pricing and subsequently showing areas for competitive pricing improvement. Cost benchmarking is a valuable tool for Supply Chain Managers when creating a negotiation strategy to drive down overall COGS. The objectives of benchmarking are to determine what and where improvements are called for, to analyze how other organizations achieve their high performance levels, and to use this information to improve performance.

Cost benchmarking is a growing factor in Cost Analysis, where there is a systematic breakdown of existing cost data to allow for closer examination. However, Procurement Professionals often face immense difficulty in identifying their market peers' pricing due to the confidentiality tied to competitive advantage.
