= Customer cost =

Customer cost refers to the price of a product and also includes purchase costs, use costs, and post-use costs. Purchase costs involve the expenses associated with searching for a product, gathering information about it, and acquiring that information. Typically, the highest use costs are associated with durable goods that have a high demand for resources, such as energy or water, or those with significant maintenance costs. Post-use costs include the expenses related to collecting, storing, and disposing of the product after it has been discarded.

== Total consumer cost in contrast to price ==
The term price usually refers to the amount of money charged for a product or service. It represents the payment made by the consumer and received by the producer when the ownership of the product or service is transferred from the seller to the buyer. The price of a product has different functions: for the producer, the most important one is to produce revenues and to cover the costs of production, distribution and sale of a product. Price also signals quality and reflects existing supply and demand. It can promote competitive advantages by helping to achieve various marketing objectives and allowing for market segmentation.

For the consumer, price is only one part of total cost of a product. The consumer has the additional costs of transportation, usage and eventually, disposal of the product. Together, these costs are referred to as the total customer cost (TCC). In contrast to price, which is a producer-oriented concept, TCC focuses on the consumer and includes all of the steps of the consumption process.

Conventional marketing and microeconomic theories assume that consumers intend to maximize their benefits and minimize their costs. Consequently, consumers choose the product with the highest difference between the expected benefits and the costs of obtaining the product.

Price is of special importance in the cost assessment process, since it is expressed in monetary terms and known to the consumer before the purchase. Price is also a part of the upfront costs, and consumers have a tendency to focus more on present costs than on future loses or gains.

Cost assessment differs between individuals, and depend on various personal and situational factors, such as socio-ecological awareness and knowledge, income, peer group and the purchasing situation. Like other products, sustainable products will only be bought if their perceived net benefit is higher than the one of conventional products.

== Elements of total customer cost ==
=== Purchase costs ===
Purchase costs include the cost of searching for a product, gathering information about it and transporting it, collectively also referred to as transaction costs.

The initial purchase of a product has the highest search and information costs. The consumer might also perceive additional risks in comparison to purchasing familiar products:

- financial risks: fear of the product being financially negative
- performance risks: fear of the product not performing as anticipated
- physical risks: fear of the product being harmful to user
- time risks: fear of the product being time-consuming in its adoption or use
- social risks: fear of the reaction of their personal social network to the product
- psychological risks: fear of the negative post-purchase emotions such as disappointment, regret or frustration of the purchase

In Information Economics, product qualities are differentiated into three types:

- Search qualities: which can be fully evaluated before a purchase (e.g. design).
- Experience qualities: can be evaluated after the purchase (e.g. durability).
- Credence qualities: which can't be fully evaluated by the consumer (e.g. social conditions of production workers), since they stem from the production or post-use processes. Consumers rely on the information provided by the producer, or by third-party organizations

The purchase costs of sustainable products are often higher when compared to the costs of more conventional products. The reason for the higher cost is that the features which differentiate these products are often determined by either personal experience or credence qualities, which have the highest search and information costs.

Transportation costs may be dependent on the availability of the product. This might pose another difficulty to new sustainable products entering the market: if the distribution intensity is low, the probable traveling distance for the customer is high, resulting in higher costs for the product purchase.

=== Use costs ===
Long-lasting products, such as cars or houses, require energy and maintenance, resulting in considerable operating costs when in use. These use related costs are often neglected or underestimated when the consumer purchases a product. Use costs also include the costs of switching to a new product. The consumer faces the costs of change if the product requires a different way of use. An extreme example for this would be the new behavioral patterns necessary for switching from owning a car to car-sharing or using public transportation systems.

This perceived cost can prevent consumers from switching to newly introduced sustainable products, that are designed to be resource efficient, thus having lower use costs than conventional products. Products such as washing machines and refrigerators are examples that save water and energy in significant amounts, at the cost of complicated controls.

=== Post-use costs ===
Post-use costs comprise the costs, which occur after the product is at the end of its life: the costs include the collection, storage and disposal of the item. These costs are strongly affiliated to the type and amount of packaging, design and durability of the product, the use of recycled materials and the possible resale, recycle and deposition possibilities.

Consumers are generally not very aware of post-use costs. Since developed countries usually include the disposal costs in property or public service taxes, these costs are not explicitly related to the product, except when those extra costs are billed directly to the consumer.

In order to dispose waste, it either has to be dropped off at a collection point or collected at the curbside. In the first case the consumer has transportation costs; in the second case the consumer faces storage costs. In addition, there are the hidden costs for separating the waste, for the time consumed by it, and the time cost of learning how the disposal system works.

Resale can be a way to reduce the post-use costs, and has become more attractive through low cost electronic selling platforms such as eBay. Recycling a product also extends the lifespan and enhances the material value of the product.

== Marketer perspective ==
Sustainability marketing should consider the total customer cost for the entire consumption process, which is equal to the sum of all costs related to a product. This includes the price, purchase costs, use costs and post-use costs. Marketers integrate this perspective into a marketing strategy in order to promote sustainable products. Two important purposes of sustainability marketing are the reduction of the total customer cost and making customers aware of it.

=== Reducing total customer cost ===
==== Price ====
In economics, demand curve theory demonstrates that the demand of a good is a function of first, its price and second, that the demand generally moves in the opposite direction of price change. This doesn't apply when consumers interpret high prices as an indicator of quality or exclusivity. For instance LOHAS (Lifestyles of Health and Sustainability) are consumers who value sustainable products and esteem quality. Indeed, the price elasticity of demand varies between types of purchase and among consumer segments. This is the process that companies use to adjust demand by setting prices. Three price-setting strategies are generally employed: value-based pricing, cost-based pricing and rent/lease pricing.

==== Value-Based Pricing ====
Value Based Pricing

Value-based pricing strategy is founded on a differentiation strategy, and uses buyer’s perceptions of value, which are based on experience. It is customer-driven, and is expressed in terms of setting the highest price possible to the greatest extent that the market will bear. Since sustainable products are expected to be more expensive than the conventional ones, this strategy is particularly suitable for them. Indeed, suppliers increase the price because a price increase adds value to the product by adding sustainability benefits, regardless of the underlying cost structure. The application of premium pricing for sustainable products and the amount that the customer would be willing to pay for that product are just two of the questions that need to be answered by marketers, and taking into account:

- The nature of the product and the level of differentiation in the market
- The profile of the sustainability issues to which the product is linked
- The credibility level that the company and the product enjoy in the market
- The perceived value of sustainable products versus conventional products
- The price sensitivity of customers: socio-ecological actives vs. passives, and their awareness of and interest in sustainability issues related to the product
- The existence and use of reference pricing in the product category

==== Cost-based pricing ====
Cost Based Pricing

Cost-based pricing strategy is based on the seller’s cost. It is product and production cost driven, meaning that the set price covers all the costs of the production and includes a target profit margin. This is typical for low-cost strategies that aim to reduce costs in purchasing and production processes, in order to offer low prices for the mass markets. Products are made affordable for consumers with low income, and contribute to sustainability because they meet certain social criteria. However, offering low prices to customers raises the question of the internalization of ecological and social costs. This means that sustainable products, for example, that have sought to internalize the social and ecological costs associated with consumption and production will involve increased costs that are reflected in a higher consumer price, when they are compared to those that do not. This is due to the implementation of a sustainability marketing strategy. Even if the production of sustainable products may require a higher initial capital costs, the changes in operations usually result in lower long-term costs. From a marketer perspective, increasing sales volume and achieving savings by cutting production costs of sustainable products may be the solutions to reduce the total customer cost.

==== Rent/lease pricing ====
The principle of renting or leasing pricing strategy is that the right to use the product is transferred for a specified period (hours or days for renting and years for leasing) from the seller to the buyer, but no transfer of title occurs. There is no legal process by which ownership of a piece of property changes from the seller to the buyer. At the end of the specified period the vendor takes the product back for reuse or recycling. The advantages of this approach are that the customer doesn't have to bear the capital purchase costs and that the product's efficiency is increased. A trade-off exists between capital costs, self-esteem attached to product ownership, rental and transaction costs.

=== Strategic aspects ===
According to Belz (2005) we have observed since the beginning of the 21st century that the classical market structure has changed. The consumer goods market is characterized by "polarization", which means that the middle price and quality segment decreased, while the lower price segment and the upper quality segment grow in significance and in market shares. In the past, the middle segment was most of the market share and today, a large low price segment and a growing premium quality segment on top characterize markets such as cars, furniture and food. It will therefore be difficult for the products and brands that are positioned in the middle segment to survive in the market whereas those that are positioned in the upper or lower segment should be likely to succeed. Companies present on the lower segment such as IKEA and H&M compete on costs and aim at price-sensitive consumers, which are socio-ecological passives. Even if they may assume social and ecological responsibility along the whole supply chain and produce sustainable products, their main aim is not so much socio-ecological differentiation, but rather maintaining their brand image and corporate reputation.

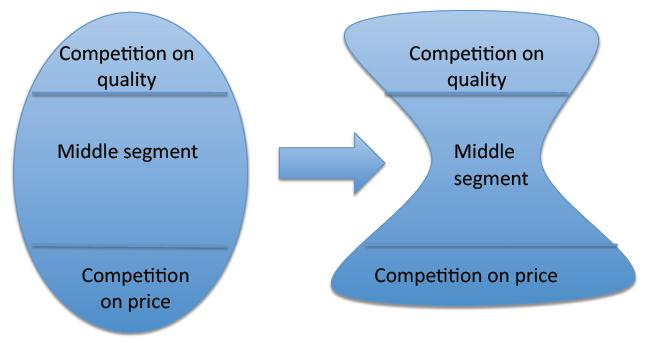
Change in Competition

=== Purchase costs ===
Purchase costs are the part of total customer cost which is a substantial part of the consumer's purchasing decisions. Other cost elements that are not as explicit as purchase costs are commonly weighed less important, although they may contribute significant amounts to the total costs. The competitiveness of products consequently depends on competitive purchase costs which include search, information and transportation costs, and risks that the consumer senses, especially for sustainable products. Requirements for marketing campaigns in mass media require a high availability of product.

=== Use costs ===
Use costs emerge after the purchase of goods within the period of use, and are frequently related to energy consumption and the amount of maintenance required. For the successful launch of products, this requires an emphasis on saving potentials, especially in the case of sustainable products. Use costs assessment also enables customers to consider future costs more adequately. Switching costs of consumers are also included in use costs. Switching costs occur due to the inconvenience and risks caused by possible changes in use patterns. Understandable, interesting and broadly available information about the use and use costs of a product is essential, and reduces switching costs significantly. Sufficient employees training is necessary to ensure a profound level of product knowledge, especially for sales personnel in the sustainability branch.

=== Post-use costs ===
Post-use costs are classified as both direct and indirect costs. Direct post-use costs are directly paid by the consumer and occur due to the disposal and transportation of the products. An efficient measurement used to lower post-use costs is the extension of product life cycles through repair, reuse or upgrading of used products. The result is a reduction of the general throughput of resources.

In the case of indirect costs, the producer manages the disposal, resale or recycling of products after their period of use, following the ‘extended producer responsibility’ concept which is already common in several OECD countries. Consumers may barter used products, return them for money, donate them or receive leasing return. The purpose of this concept is to encourage the companies to reduce waste. This may be achieved by designing processes more efficiently, increasing recycling and establishing markets for secondary materials. Emerging new cost structures may lead to increasing or decreasing market prices, depending on the trade-off between material savings and compliance costs for disposal and recycling.

== Customer’s awareness of total cost ==
Consumers tend to base their buying decisions on incomplete and biased information about total costs of products which is referred to as bounded rationality. Sufficient calculations of savings due to lower use costs (e.g. energy consumption) and trade-offs are not possible under these conditions, although savings are probable. This price sensitivity of consumers is enforced by price focused marketing techniques. Sustainable marketers consequently may use producer instruments such as saving calculators (e.g. energy saving potential of Electrolux lights), life cycle cost information sheets or labeling instruments to emphasize the advantages of lower use costs when compared to conventional products.

== Case study ==
A good example for better understanding the concept of Customer Costs in Sustainability Marketing is the introduction of the product “Marathon” by Royal Philips Electronics.

In 1980, Philips Lighting paved the way for a more energy efficient and environmental friendly technology in the lighting sector by inventing the compact fluorescent light bulb (CFL). Although the newly introduced light bulb had a longer lifetime, was more energy efficient and reduced the heat emissions to a minimum, it was not welcome in the market. Due to its higher acquisition price, inconvenient shape and dissatisfying functionality, the penetration rate of CFL bulbs into the lighting market stayed low (<0,1 CFL/American household) until the mid-90s. Not even the introduction of the award-winning “Earth Light” changed the consumer attitude towards the environmentally friendly CFL bulb. A market survey exposed the major problems: very high acquisition price (10,80 € in comparison to 0,55 € for incandescent light bulbs) and confusion among the customers about the functionality and lifetime expectancy of CFL bulbs. Following these problems, in 2000 Philips introduced a new brand of long-lasting and energy efficient products, called “Marathon” which promised up to 25% of energy saving during its whole lifetime (5-7 yrs). The “Marathon” series provided a range of long-lasting and energy-efficient light bulbs, all labeled by the Energy Star and suitable for many locations and different demands of the customer.

Philips therefore was able to shift the focus from the higher acquisition costs to the lower total costs during the entire lifetime of a CFL bulb. For sustainability marketers it is a crucial success factor to create awareness among the customers about the total costs of products.

== The nature of price system ==
One of the most challenging tasks of sustainability marketers is to create awareness among the customers about the total costs of the product. Another challenging task is the problem of social and environmental costs, which are not included in the actual price. These external costs can consist in exploitation of natural resources, bad working conditions in factories, underpayment of workers, destruction of the ecosystem, high carbon dioxide emissions during the production process etc. Since these costs are not included in the purchasing price, unsustainable products have a competitive advantage and can be offered at a cheaper price on the market. Price system therefore doesn't include the externalized costs that are sustained mostly by the environment, ecosystem, general public and developing countries.

One solution to this problem might be the internalization of costs, which will be likely to take place in the future due to increasing importance of social and environmental topics. The task of sustainability marketers is to foresee the change of customer behavior and to duly anticipate the effects of internalizing social and environmental costs in the long run.
