= IT chargeback and showback =

IT chargeback and IT showback (memo-back) are two policies used by information technology (IT) departments to allocate and/or bill the costs associated with each department's or division's usage.

== Chargeback ==
The need to understand the components of the costs of IT, and to fund the IT organization in the face of unexpected demands from user departments, led to the development of chargeback mechanisms, in which a requesting department gets an internal bill (or "cross-charge") for the costs that are directly associated to the infrastructure, data transfer, application licenses, training, etc., which they generate. The purpose of chargeback includes:

- Making departments responsible in their usage, e.g., refrain from asking for resources they are not going to use
- Providing visibility to the head of IT and to senior management on the reasons behind the costs of IT
- Allowing the IT department to respond to unexpected customer demand by saying "yes, we can do it, but you will have to pay for it" instead of saying "no, we cannot do this because it's not in the budget."

As of 2011, the chargeback mechanisms are often controversial in organizations. Departments rarely pay directly for their own electricity bill, janitorial services, etc. -- these are allocated to departments on the basis of the number of employees or the square footage they occupy. Similarly, departments may expect to pay a fixed allocation for IT and get a flexible set of services that meet their needs in return. While the discussion on such an allocation are always difficult, seeing actual variable charges arrive on a monthly basis for specific levels of usage can create conflict both between IT and its internal customers, and between a department manager and the users who caused resource consumption to increase and therefore costs to rise.

The rise of subscription-based computing services (cloud computing) may make chargeback mechanisms more palatable.

== Showback ==
Around 2010, the concept of IT showback emerged to keep the advantages of chargeback without some of its drawbacks. Showback consists of providing IT management, departments, and corporate management with an analysis of the IT costs due to each department, without actually cross-charging those costs.

The pressure on the departments to limit their usage is less direct, but awareness of the costs usually causes department heads and senior management to question why a department is "spending" more than another in IT.

== See also ==
- IT cost transparency
- Financial management for IT services (ITSM)#Charging
- Virtual chargeback
