= Cost object =

Something to which costs are assigned

A cost object is a term used primarily in cost accounting to describe something to which costs are assigned. Common examples of cost objects are product lines, geographic territories, customers, departments or anything else for which management would like to quantify cost.

The use of cost objects is common within activity based costing and Grenzplankostenrechnung systems.

== See also ==
- Cost centre (business)
