= Cost =

Money spent to produce or procure goods or services

Cost is the value of money that has been used up to produce something or deliver a service, and hence is not available for use anymore. In business, the cost may be one of acquisition, in which case the amount of money expended to acquire it is counted as cost. In this case, money is the input that is gone in order to acquire the thing. This acquisition cost may be the sum of the cost of production as incurred by the original producer, and further costs of transaction as incurred by the acquirer over and above the price paid to the producer. Usually, the price also includes a mark-up for profit over the cost of production.

More generalized in the field of economics, cost is a metric that is totaling up as a result of a process or as a differential for the result of a decision. Hence cost is the metric used in the standard modeling paradigm applied to economic processes.

Costs (pl.) are often further described based on their timing or their applicability.

== Types of accounting costs ==
In accounting, costs are the monetary value of expenditures for supplies, services, labor, products, equipment and other items purchased for use by a business or other accounting entity. It is the amount denoted on invoices as the price and recorded in book keeping records as an expense or asset cost basis.

Opportunity cost, also referred to as economic cost is the value of the best alternative that was not chosen in order to pursue the current endeavor that is., what could have been accomplished with the resources expended in the undertaking. It represents opportunities forgone.

In theoretical economics, cost used without qualification often means opportunity cost.

== Comparing private, external, and social costs ==
When a transaction takes place, it typically involves both private costs and external costs.

Private costs are the costs that the buyer of a good or service pays the seller. This can also be described as the costs internal to the firm's production function.

External costs (also called externalities), in contrast, are the costs that people other than the buyer are forced to pay as a result of the transaction. The bearers of such costs can be either particular individuals or society at large. Note that external costs are often both non-monetary and problematic to quantify for comparison with monetary values. They include things like pollution, things that society will likely have to pay for in some way or at some time in the future, even so that are not included in transaction prices.

Social costs are the sum of private costs and external costs.

For example, the manufacturing cost of a car (i.e., the costs of buying inputs, land tax rates for the car plant, overhead costs of running the plant and labor costs) reflects the private cost for the manufacturer (in some ways, normal profit can also be seen as a cost of production; see, e.g., Ison and Wall, 2007, p. 181). The polluted waters or polluted air also created as part of the process of producing the car is an external cost borne by those who are affected by the pollution or who value unpolluted air or water. Because the manufacturer does not pay for this external cost (the cost of emitting undesirable waste into the commons), and does not include this cost in the price of the car (a Kaldor–Hicks compensation), they are said to be external to the market pricing mechanism. The air pollution from driving the car is also an externality produced by the car user in the process of using his good. The driver does not compensate for the environmental damage caused by using the car.

== Cost estimation ==
When developing a business plan for a new or existing company, product or project, planners typically make cost estimates in order to assess whether revenues/benefits will cover costs (see cost–benefit analysis). Costs are often underestimated, resulting in cost overruns during execution.

Cost-plus pricing is where the price equals cost plus a percentage of overhead or profit margin. In business economics, the profitability of a trade or sales prospect relies on the ability of an enterprise to sustain market prices that cover all costs and leave a surplus for owner interest, as expressed by:

$\text{Profit = Revenues – Costs}.$ (Note: Gross profit is revenue minus the cost of goods sold.)

== Manufacturing costs vs. non-manufacturing costs ==
Manufacturing costs are those costs that are directly involved in manufacturing of products. Examples of manufacturing costs include raw materials costs and charges related to workers. Manufacturing cost is divided into three broad categories:

1. Direct materials cost
2. Direct labor cost
3. Manufacturing overhead cost

Non-manufacturing costs are those costs that are not directly incurred in manufacturing a product. Examples of such costs are salary of sales personnel and advertising expenses. Generally, non-manufacturing costs are further classified into two categories:

1. Selling and distribution costs
2. Administrative costs

== Other costs ==
A defensive cost is an environmental expenditure to eliminate or prevent environmental damage. Defensive costs form part of the genuine progress indicator (GPI) calculations.

Labour costs would include travel time, holiday pay, training costs, working clothes, social insurance, taxes on employment &c.

Path cost is a term in networking to define the worthiness of a path, see Routing.

Non-monetary costs can be related to intrinsic motivation.

== See also ==
- Average cost
- Cost accounting
- Cost curve
- Cost object
- Direct cost
- Fixed cost
- Incremental cost
- Indirect cost
- Life-cycle cost
- Non-monetary economy
- Outline of industrial organization
- Repugnancy costs
- Semi-variable cost
- Total cost
- Variable cost
