= Responsibility center =

Organizational unit of a company

A responsibility center is an organizational unit headed by a manager, who is responsible for its activities and results. In responsibility accounting, revenues and cost information are collected and reported on by responsibility centers.

Typical examples of responsibility centers are the profit center, cost center and the investment center.

== Profit center ==
A profit center is characterized by the responsibility to choose inputs and outputs with a fixed level of investment.

=== Performance evaluation ===
A typical measurement for profit center management is the ability to maximize profits as they are responsible for both costs and revenues.

== Cost center ==
A cost center is characterized by the lowest level of responsibility compared to the other two centers. Cost center managers are expected to produce as much output with a fixed amount of resources/input and to reduce costs.

=== Performance evaluation ===
Managers are generally evaluated based on cost control and reduction as they have no delegation to increase sales generation.

== Investment center ==
An investment center has the highest level of delegated autonomy. Investment center's have the highest level of autonomy as they can determine the level of inputs, outputs and additional investments.

=== Performance evaluation ===
The most common metric for evaluating management performance is the return on investment (ROI). The unit can be held responsible for generating an adequate ROI as the business unit has the autonomy to determine the key influencing variables.
