= Cost centre =

Management accounting term

A cost centre is an activity within a business to which costs can be apportioned or allocated. The term includes departments which do not produce directly but they incur costs to the business, when the manager and employees of the cost centre are not accountable for the profitability and investment decisions of the business but they are responsible for some of its costs.

== Types ==
There are two main types of cost centres:

- Production cost centres, where the products are manufactured or processed. An example of this is an assembly area.
- Service cost centres, where services are provided to other business units or other cost centres, for example a personnel department, the logistics function, or a canteen.

== Function-specific cost ==
The main function of a cost centre is the tracing of all expenses linked with a certain function. For example, by considering a call centre as an independent unit, the firm can calculate how much it is spending each year for its call centre support service. If a cost centre is not considered independent then it would take a lot of effort in measuring the cost of providing this service because it will include dividing up the company's entire personnel and phone bills by department each month.

== Benefits ==
There are numerous benefits of a cost centre which include:

- Monitoring efficiency – Cost centres are beneficial as they allow the effectiveness of all aspects within a company to be monitored closely.
- Employee confidence – The delegation of authority that takes place when making employees accountable for cost centre is a way to improve confidence.
- Loss prevention – Cost centres try to update processes, be more effective and save money so that they can reduce the expenses. Cost centres try to cover all of their costs with offsetting revenue by reducing expenses and producing unpredicted revenue, thus preventing loss.
- Increasing profit – If one of the cost centres is removed from a firm then it has a negative impact on the profit margin of that firm. For example, if an HR department was removed then basic employment functions and essential business processes cannot be performed which will affect the firm's profit negatively.
- Management efficiency – Managers compare cost data from different time periods in order to see whether the cost centre is becoming more or less profitable. Generally a specific person (a cost centre manager) is held accountable for costs incurring in the cost centre under his or her control, in which case, collecting and comparing costs may motivate the manager to be more productive.

== Drawbacks ==
There are a few drawbacks of cost centre which include:

- Negative effects on other departments – although the cost of operating a specific department is simple to calculate, cost centres are a source of encouragement for managers to underfund their elements so that it can benefit the cost centre, which can have a harmful effect on other departments within the firm.
- Hard to monitor efficiency – It is hard to keep a track of how efficient these centres are.
- Profit can not be controlled – Divisional performance can only be evaluated in terms of cost because profit is not in control of the manager.
- Efficiency and productivity cannot be assessed properly – in a cost centre, the result of a decision is calculated by cost alone; the achievements of the cost centre are not measured in financial terms, therefore it is hard to assess efficiency and productivity properly.

== Difference between a cost centre and a profit centre ==
A cost centre adds to a firm's cost whereas a profit centre adds to the firm's cost and profit. Furthermore, the main objective of a cost centre is to minimise cost whereas the main objective of a profit centre is to maximise profit. Profit centres provide a wider and more general measurement of performance than the cost centre. In cost centre, the manager is only responsible for the cost whereas in a profit centre, the manager is responsible for cost and profit. In situations like this when manager is responsible for both, profit and cost, the contribution of each manager to the goal of the firm becomes easier to measure.

== See also ==
- Responsibility center
- Revenue center
