= Indirect costs =

Costs that are not directly accountable to a cost object

Indirect costs are costs that are not directly accountable to a cost object (such as a particular project, facility, function or product). Like direct costs, indirect costs may be either fixed or variable. Indirect costs include administration, personnel and security costs. These are those costs which are not directly related to production. Some indirect costs may be overhead, but other overhead costs can be directly attributed to a project and are direct costs.

There are two types of indirect costs. One are the fixed indirect costs, which are unchanged for a particular project or company, like transportation of labor to the working site, building temporary roads, etc. The other are recurring indirect costs, which repeat for a particular company, like maintenance of records or the payment of salaries.

== Indirect vs direct costs ==
Most cost estimates are broken down into direct costs and indirect costs.

Direct costs are directly attributable to the object. In construction, the costs of materials, labor, equipment, etc., and all directly involved efforts or expenses for the cost object are direct costs. In manufacturing or other non-construction industries the portion of operating costs that is directly assignable to a specific product or process is a direct cost. Direct costs are those for activities or services that benefit specific projects, for example salaries for project staff and materials required for a particular project. Because these activities are easily traced to projects, their costs are usually charged to projects on an item-by-item basis.

Indirect costs are, but not necessarily, not directly attributable to a cost object. It should be financially infeasible to do so. Indirect costs are typically allocated to a cost object on some basis. In construction, all costs which are required for completion of the installation, but are not directly attributable to the cost object are indirect, such as overhead. In manufacturing, costs not directly assignable to the end product or process are indirect. These may be costs for management, insurance, taxes, or maintenance, for example. Indirect costs are those for activities or services that benefit more than one project. Their precise benefits to a specific project are often difficult or impossible to trace. For example, it may be difficult to determine precisely how the activities of the director of an organization benefit a specific project. Indirect costs do not vary substantially within certain production volumes or other indicators of activity, and so they may sometimes be considered to be fixed costs.

It is possible to justify the handling of almost any kind of cost as either direct or indirect. Labor costs, for example, can be indirect, as in the case of maintenance personnel and executive officers; or they can be direct, as in the case of project staff members. Similarly, materials such as miscellaneous supplies purchased in bulk—pencils, pens, paper—are typically handled as indirect costs, while materials required for specific projects are charged as direct costs.

Often, such as when applying for funding under a grant, indirect costs are specified as a fixed percentage, this percentage having been negotiated in advance. This is the case, for example, in federally-funded research in the United States. In this case, the indirect costs percentage is specified relative to direct costs, not to the total request. A grant requesting $100k in direct costs with an indirect cost rate of 50%, for example, means that the request will include an additional request for $50k for indirect costs for a total request of $150k, as opposed to a request for $100k of indirect costs for a total request of $200k.

== Examples ==
The same cost can be labeled as indirect in one industry and direct in another. For example, fuel cost in a telecom is usually allocated as an indirect cost, while for an airliner it is a direct cost.

=== Costs usually charged directly ===
- Salary/wages
- Consultants
- Materials
- Tools
- Rent
- Transport
- Labour
- Direct materials
- PPC
- Any kind of subcontract which is attributable to direct works but the specific company does not possess the required skill

=== Costs either charged directly or allocated indirectly ===
- Director's salary (this is usually an indirect cost)
- Electricity (mostly if it needs allocation it is always indirect)

Note that if electricity is not used as primary source for production then electricity cost will be treated as utility and is always indirect. For example, if electricity is required to run the boiler which in turn generates steam, then electricity needs to be allocated directly.

=== Costs usually allocated indirectly ===
- Indirect costs related to transport
- Administration cost
- Selling & distribution cost
- Office cost
- Security cost
- Shipping and Postage
- Utilities and rent

== See also ==
- Total cost of ownership
