= Inventory valuation =

An inventory valuation allows a company to provide a monetary value for items that make up their inventory. Inventories are usually the largest current asset of a business, and proper measurement of them is necessary to assure accurate financial statements. If inventory is not properly measured, expenses and revenues cannot be properly matched and a company could make poor business decisions.

An inventory and valuation of assets may also be used for other purposes. For example, in the attachment of a debtor's property or in compulsory transfer. An inventory and valuation of assets is an official court document that lists all assets included in the deceased's estate and their fair market value as of the date of death. Inheritance may be effected under a will or in accordance with intestacy law if the deceased left no will.

== Inventory accounting system ==
The two most widely used inventory accounting systems are the periodic and the perpetual.

- Perpetual: The perpetual inventory system requires accounting records to show the amount of inventory on hand at all times. It maintains a separate account in the subsidiary ledger for each good in stock, and the account is updated each time a quantity is added or taken out.
- Periodic: In the periodic inventory system, sales are recorded as they occur but the inventory is not updated. A physical inventory must be taken at the end of the year to determine the cost of goods

Regardless of what inventory accounting system is used, it is good practice to perform a physical inventory at least once a year.

== Inventory methods - perpetual ==
The perpetual system records revenue each time a sale is made. Determining the cost of goods sold requires taking inventory. The most commonly used inventory valuation methods under a perpetual system are:

1. first-in first-out (FIFO)
2. last-in first-out (LIFO)
3. (highest in, first out) (HIFO)
4. average cost or weighted average cost

These methods produce different results because their flow of costs are based upon different assumptions. The FIFO method bases its cost flow on the chronological order in which purchases are made, while the LIFO method bases its cost flow on a reverse chronological order. The average cost method produces a cost flow based on a weighted average of goods.

== Periodic versus perpetual systems ==
There are fundamental differences for accounting and reporting merchandise inventory transactions under the periodic and perpetual inventory systems. To record purchases, the periodic system debits the Purchases account while the perpetual system debits the Merchandise Inventory account. To record sales, the perpetual system requires an extra entry to debit the Cost of goods sold and credit Merchandise Inventory. By recording the cost of goods sold for each sale, the perpetual inventory system alleviated the need for adjusting entries and calculation of the goods sold at the end of a financial period, both of which the periodic inventory system requires.

In a perpetual inventory system, there must be actual figures and facts.

== Using non-cost methods to value inventory ==
Under certain circumstances, valuation of inventory based on cost is impractical. If the market price of a good drops below the purchase price, the lower of cost or market method of valuation is recommended. This method allows declines in inventory value to be offset against income of the period. When goods are damaged or obsolete, and can only be sold for below purchase prices, they should be recorded at net realizable value. The net realizable value is the estimated selling price less any expense incurred to dispose of the good.

== Methods used to estimate inventory cost ==
In certain business operations, taking a physical inventory is impossible or impractical. In such a situation, it is necessary to estimate the inventory cost.

Two very popular methods are 1)- retail inventory method, and 2)- gross profit (or gross margin) method. The retail inventory method uses a cost to retail price ratio. The physical inventory is valued at retail, and it is multiplied by the cost ratio (or percentage) to determine the estimated cost of the ending inventory.

The gross profit method uses the previous years average gross profit margin (i.e. sales minus cost of goods sold divided by sales). Current year gross profit is estimated by multiplying current year sales by that gross profit margin, the current year cost of goods sold is estimated by subtracting the gross profit from sales, and the ending inventory is estimated by adding cost of goods sold to goods available for sale.
