= Average cost method =

Average cost method is an inventory valuation method in accounting that assigns a cost to inventory based on the average cost of goods available for sale during a period. Instead of tracking individual purchase prices, the method applies an average unit cost to both cost of goods sold (COGS) and ending inventory.

The average unit cost is computed by dividing the total cost of goods available for sale by the total number of units available for sale. The resulting weighted-average cost per unit is then used to value inventory and cost of goods sold.

Two principal variations of the average cost method are commonly used: the weighted-average cost method, applied in a periodic inventory system, and the moving-average cost method, applied in a perpetual inventory system.

== Weighted-average cost (periodic method) ==
The weighted-average cost (WAC) method is used in a periodic inventory system. Under this approach, the average cost per unit is calculated at the end of the accounting period.

The calculation follows these steps:

- Determine the total cost of goods available for sale (beginning inventory plus purchases).
- Determine the total units available for sale.
- Divide total cost by total units to obtain the weighted-average unit cost.

Ending inventory is valued by multiplying the weighted-average unit cost by the number of units remaining at period end. Cost of goods sold is calculated using the same average unit cost.

This method smooths the effect of price fluctuations over the accounting period.

== Moving-average cost (perpetual method) ==
The moving-average cost (MAC) method is used in a perpetual inventory system. Under this approach, the average unit cost is recalculated after each purchase.

When additional inventory is acquired:

- The total inventory cost is updated.
- The quantity on hand is updated.
- A new average unit cost is calculated by dividing updated total cost by updated quantity.

When a sale occurs, inventory is reduced by the quantity sold and cost of goods sold is computed using the most recently determined moving-average unit cost.

The moving-average method continuously updates inventory values and is commonly used in computerized accounting systems.

== See also ==
- FIFO and LIFO accounting
- Inventory
- Cost of goods sold
- Specific identification (inventories)
