= Cost of goods available for sale =

Cost of goods available for sale is the maximum amount of goods, or inventory, that a company can possibly sell during an accounting period. It has the formula:

Beginning Inventory (at the start of accounting period) + purchases (within the accounting period) + Production (within the accounting period) = cost of goods available for sale

Notice that purchases and production might not be the same throughout the year, since purchase cost and production cost might vary. But at the end, the total cost of purchases and production are added to beginning inventory cost to give cost of goods available for sale.

Alternatively the costs of goods available for sales can be computed from the costs of sales:

Costs of goods available for sale − Ending Inventory − Inventory write-downs = Cost of goods sold
