= Specific identification (inventories) =

Inventory cost method

Specific identification is a method of finding out ending inventory cost.

It requires a detailed physical count so that the company knows exactly how many of each good bought on specific dates comprise the year-end inventory. When this information is found, the amount of goods is multiplied by their purchase cost at their purchase date to get a number for the ending inventory cost.

In theory, this method is considered the most accurate since it directly relates the ending inventory goods to the specific price they were bought for. However, it also presents a loophole for management to manipulate the ending inventory cost. They can choose to report that the cheaper goods were sold first, thereby inflating the ending inventory cost and reducing the cost of goods sold, consequently boosting income. Alternatively, management could choose to report lower income to reduce the taxes they are required to pay.

This method is also very hard to use on interchangeable goods. For example, relating shipping and storage costs to a specific inventory item becomes difficult. These numbers often need to be estimated, diminishing the specificity advantage of the specific identification method. Thus, this method is generally limited to large, high-ticket items which can be easily identified specifically (such as tract houses).

== See also ==
- FIFO and LIFO accounting – Methods used in managing inventory
- Inventory – Goods held for resale
- Moving-average cost
- Weighted average cost
