= Quantiacs =

Crowd-sourced quant platform

- Company type: Privately held company
- Founded: 2014; 12 years ago
- Headquarters: United States
- Services: Web Platforms
- Website: www.quantiacs.com

Quantiacs is a crowd-sourced quant platform hosting algorithmic trading contests and a marketplace serving investors and quants.

== History ==
Quantiacs was founded in 2014.

The company has grown from a base of users of 6,500 quants in April 2017 to over 10,000 quants in January 2018.

== Business model ==
The company invests some of its own money in the competition winners and aims to become a marketplace for automated trading systems. Quantiacs does not charge management fees to investors and assigns performance fees of 10% of the strategy net new profits to the quants who developed the systems.

The performance of the algorithms can be controlled on the Quantiacs website as their charts are publicly displayed.

The company focuses on quantitative strategies with long term performance horizons, highly scalable and with multiple years of backtested data. Algorithms are tested for at least 6 months to ensure their statistical robustness before being eligible for trading.

In December 2020 a study has used public data from Quantiacs to show how investors respond to the availability of new predictive signals.

== Technology ==
Quantiacs provides an open-source backtester and it supported Matlab and Python until 2021. In 2021 it released a new version of its backtesting engine focused on Python. Users can work online or use a local version of the backtester for own design and testing of systems.
