= Hurdle rate =

Hurdle rate may refer to

- a minimum acceptable rate of return on a project
- a level of return that a hedge fund must exceed before it can charge a performance fee
