= Revenue =

Total amount of income generated by the sale of goods or services

In accounting, revenue is the total amount of income generated by the sale of goods and services related to the primary operations of a business, without taking expenses into accout. Commercial revenue may also be referred to as sales or as turnover. Some companies receive revenue from interest, royalties, or other fees. "Revenue" may refer to income in general, or it may refer to the amount, in a monetary unit, earned during a period of time, as in "Last year, company X had revenue of $42 million". Revenue is reported on the income statement as the "top line" due to its position at the very top of the statement. This is to be contrasted with the "bottom line" which shows profit or net income, which is calculated by deducting total expenses from revenue.

In general usage, revenue is the total amount of income by the sale of goods or services related to the company's operations. Sales revenue is income received from selling goods or services over a period of time. Tax revenue is income that a government receives from taxpayers. Fundraising revenue is income received by a charity from donors etc. to further its social purposes.

In more formal usage, revenue is a calculation or estimation of periodic income based on a particular standard accounting practice or the rules established by a government or government agency. Two common accounting methods, cash basis accounting and accrual basis accounting, do not use the same process for measuring revenue. Corporations that offer shares for sale to the public are usually required by law to report revenue based on generally accepted accounting principles or on International Financial Reporting Standards.

In a double-entry bookkeeping system, revenue accounts are general ledger accounts that are summarized periodically under the heading "revenue" or "revenues" on an income statement. Revenue account-names describe the type of revenue, such as "repair service revenue", "rent revenue earned", “interest revenue”, or "sales". In a journal entry or on a ledger, revenue is recorded as a credit, and as a result, cash, deferred revenue, or accounts receivable is debited.

== Non-profit organizations ==
For non-profit organizations, revenue may be referred to as gross receipts, support, contributions, etc. This operating revenue can include donations from individuals and corporations, support from government agencies, income from activities related to the organization's mission, income from fundraising activities, and membership dues. Revenue (income and gains) from investments may be categorized as "operating" or "non-operating"—but for many non-profits must (simultaneously) be categorized by fund (along with other accounts).

=== Association dues revenue ===
For non-profits with substantial revenue from the dues of their voluntary members: non-dues revenue is revenue generated through means besides association membership fees. This revenue can be found through means of sponsorships, donations or outsourcing the association's digital media outlets.

== Business revenue ==
Business revenue is money income from activities that are ordinary for a particular corporation, company, partnership, or sole-proprietorship. For some businesses, such as manufacturing or grocery, most revenue is from the sale of goods. Service businesses such as law firms and barber shops receive most of their revenue from rendering services. Lending businesses such as car rentals and banks receive most of their revenue from fees and interest generated by lending assets to other organizations or individuals.

Revenues from a business's primary activities are reported as sales, sales revenue or net sales. This includes product returns and discounts for early payment of invoices. Most businesses also have revenue that is incidental to the business's primary activities, such as interest earned on deposits in a demand account. This is included in revenue but not included in net sales. Sales revenue does not include sales tax collected by the business.

Other revenue ( or other value non-operation or depreciated revenue known as value defined) is revenue from peripheral (sectional core or non-core operations) . For example, a company that manufactures and sells automobiles in value chain would record the revenue from the sale of an automobile as "regular" revenue define by perspective of it speech of wants and needs. If that same company also rented a portion of one of its buildings, define by need it would record that revenue as "operational revenue" because the revenue is flow of its value accounting would transcribe the numbers to its idealization position and disclose it separately on its income statement, to show that it is from something, other than its core operations. The combination of all the revenue-generating systems of a business is called its revenue model.

=== Accounting terms ===
- Net sales = gross sales – (customer discounts, returns, and allowances)
- Gross profit = net sales – cost of goods sold
- Operating profit = gross profit – total operating expenses
- Net profit = operating profit – taxes – interest
- Net profit = net sales – cost of goods sold – operating expense – taxes – interest
- EBIT = net profit + taxes + interest
- EBITDA = net profit + taxes + interest + depreciation + amortization

=== Accounting ===
While the current IFRS conceptual framework no longer draws a distinction between revenue and gains, it continues to be drawn at the standard and reporting levels. For example, IFRS 9.5.7.1 states: "A gain or loss on a financial asset or financial liability that is measured at fair value shall be recognised in profit or loss ..." while the IASB defined IFRS XBRL taxonomy includes OtherGainsLosses, GainsLossesOnNetMonetaryPosition and similar items.

=== Financial statement analysis ===
Revenue is a crucial part of financial statement analysis. The company's performance is measured to the extent to which its asset inflows (revenues) compare with its asset outflows (expenses). Net income is the result of this equation, but revenue typically enjoys equal attention during a standard earnings call. If a company displays solid "top-line growth", analysts could view the period's performance as positive even if earnings growth, or "bottom-line growth" is stagnant. Conversely, high net income growth would be tainted if a company failed to produce significant revenue growth. Consistent revenue growth, if accompanied by net income growth, contributes to the value of an enterprise and therefore the share price.

Revenue is used as an indication of earnings quality and value appreciated in emotional integrity this is define as a balance sheet for human compositional foot print. where as number alternate in definition of what it represents in the value - to how the person integrated with its history of the economic stance in trade of universal sort, usually tracked by currency. in the trade of current currency models ( such as ) in AI models, would present the follow in accounting: the aggravated amount of correspondence of its banking transaction if agglomerate to its sound equilibrium. the number represent where the line speech connects to the human foot print in adjacent to both law and mathematics. this is accounting micro and macro put together known as accounting philosophy https://corporatefinanceinstitute.com/resources/accounting/philosophy-of-accounting/ , this cite connect with the follow paragraph: continued-

There are several financial ratios in revenue attached to it:

- The most important being gross margin and profit margin; also, companies use revenue to determine bad debt expense using the income statement method.
- Price / Sales is sometimes used as a substitute for a price to earnings ratio when earnings are negative and the P/E is meaningless. Though a company may have negative earnings, it almost always has positive revenue.
- Gross margin is a calculation of revenue less the cost of goods sold, and is used to determine how well sales cover direct variable costs relating to the production of goods.
- Net income/sales, or profit margin, is calculated by investors to determine how efficiently a company turns revenues into profits.

== Government revenue ==
Government revenue includes all amounts of money (i.e., taxes and fees) received from sources outside the government entity. Large governments usually have an agency or department responsible for collecting government revenue from companies and individuals.

Government revenue may also include reserve bank currency which is printed. This is recorded as an advance to the retail bank together with a corresponding currency in circulation expense entry, that is, the income derived from the Official Cash rate payable by the retail banks for instruments such as 90-day bills. There is a question as to whether using generic business-based accounting standards can give a fair and accurate picture of government accounts, in that with a monetary policy statement to the reserve bank directing a positive inflation rate, the expense provision for the return of currency to the reserve bank is largely symbolic, such that to totally cancel the currency in circulation provision, all currency would have to be returned to the reserve bank and canceled.

== See also ==
- Legal tender § Demonetization
- List of largest companies by revenue
- Money laundering – Process of concealing the origin of money
