= Phantom inventory =

Phantom inventory is a common expression for goods that an inventory accounting system considers to be on-hand at a storage location but are not available. This could be due to the items being moved without recording the change in the inventory accounting system, breakage, theft, data entry errors or deliberate fraud. The resulting discrepancy between the online inventory balance and physical availability can delay automated reordering and lead to out-of-stock incidents.

If not addressed, phantom inventory can result in:

- Lost sales
- Inaccurate assessment of store or product sales performance
- Reduced accuracy of demand forecasts and plans
- Broader accounting issues and restatements

A number of techniques have been used to correct phantom inventory problems, including physical cycle counts and stock-taking, RFID tagging of items and statistical modelling of phantom inventory conditions.

== See also ==
- Inventory control system
- Inventory management software
- Operations management
- Supply chain management
- Warehouse management system
