= Carried interest =

Fee paid to an investment manager

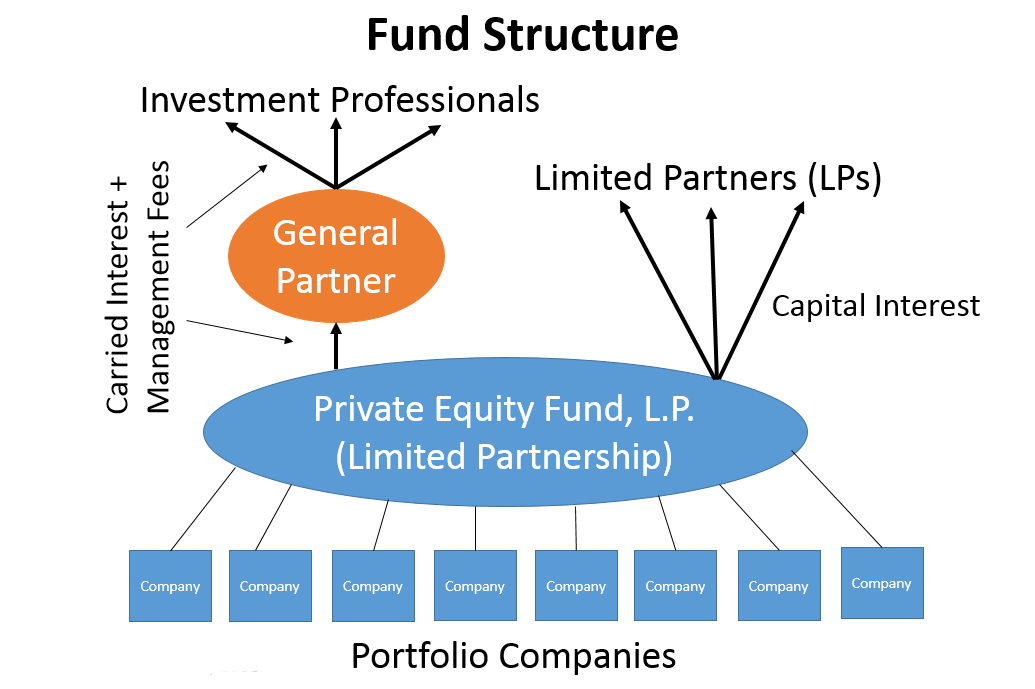
Structure of a private equity or hedge fund, which shows the carried interest and management fee received by the fund's investment managers. The general partner is the financial entity used to control and manage the fund, while the limited partners are the individual investors. The investment managers work as the general partner and are also a partner in the limited partnership. Limited partners collect their return on their capital interest.

Carried interest, or carry, in finance, is a share of the profits of an investment paid to the investment manager specifically in alternative investments (private equity and hedge funds). It is a performance fee, rewarding the manager for enhancing performance. Since these fees are generally not taxed as normal income, some believe that the structure unfairly takes advantage of favorable tax treatment, e.g. in the United States. In this regard, it is often referred to as the carried interest loophole. The Hill referred to it as "Wall Street's favorite tax break."

== History ==
The origin of carried interest can be traced to the 16th century when European ships were crossing to Asia and the Americas. The captain of the ship would take a 20% share of the profit from the carried goods to pay for the transport and the risk of sailing over oceans. The name is not connected with interest rates or interest payments on a loan or bank account.

Today, the term is used to name the compensation collected by investment executives in private equity funds. In the United States, carried interest is taxed at the same rate as long-term capital gains. Because this tax rate is fairly low, the policy has been criticized as a form of tax avoidance.

== Definition and calculation ==
Carried interest is a share of the profits of an investment paid to the investment manager in excess of the amount that the manager contributes to the partnership, specifically in alternative investments, e.g., private equity and hedge funds. It is a performance fee rewarding the manager for enhancing performance.

=== Amount and calculation ===
The manager's carried interest allocation varies depending on the type of investment fund and the demand for the fund from investors. In private equity, the standard carried interest allocation historically has been 20% for funds making buyout and venture investments, but there is some variability. Notable examples of private equity firms with carried interest of more than 20% ("super carry") include Bain Capital and Providence Equity Partners. Hedge fund carry percentages have historically centered on 20% but have had greater variability than those of private equity funds. In extreme cases performance fees have reached as high as 44% of a fund's profits but is usually between 15% and 20%.

The distribution of fund returns is often directed by a distribution waterfall. Returns generated by the investment are first distributed to return each investor's initial capital contribution, including the manager. This is not "carried interest" because it is a repayment of principal. Second, returns are paid to investors other than the manager, up to a certain previously agreed rate of return (the "hurdle rate" or "preferred return"). The customary hurdle rate is 7% to 9% per annum. Third, returns are paid to the manager until it has received a rate of return equal to the hurdle rate (the "catch-up"). Not every fund provides for a hurdle and a catch-up. Often, returns during the catch-up phase are split with the manager receiving the larger (e.g. 80%) share and the investors receiving a smaller (e.g. 20%) share, until the manager's catch-up percentage has been collected. Fourth, once the manager's returns equal the investor returns, the split reverses, with the manager taking a lower (often 20%) share and the investors taking the higher (often 80%) share. All manager returns above the returns from the manager's initial contribution are "carry" or "carried interest." The amount of carried interest a manager ultimately earns depends on how well the fund performs, which varies widely. In venture capital, returns tend to follow a power law in which a small number of investments produce most of a fund's gains.

=== Timing ===
Private equity funds distribute carried interest to managers and other investors only upon a successful exit from an investment, which may take years. In a hedge fund environment, carried interest is usually referred to as a "performance fee" and because it invests in liquid investments, it is often able to pay carried interest annually if the fund has generated a profit. This has implications for both the amount and timing of the taxes on the interest.

=== Other fees ===
Historically, carried interest has served as the primary source of income for manager and firm in both private equity and hedge funds. Both funds also tend to have an annual management fee of 1% to 2% of assets under management per year. The management fee covers the costs of investing and managing the fund. The management fee, unlike the 20% carried interest, is treated as ordinary income in the United States. As the sizes of both private equity and hedge funds have increased, management fees have become a more meaningful portion of the value proposition for fund managers as evidenced by the 2007 initial public offering of the Blackstone Group.

== Taxation ==
Private equity returns are tax-advantaged in several ways.

Private equity carried interest is treated as a long-term capital gain for tax purposes in many jurisdictions. Long-term capital gains are returns on financial and other investments that have been held for a certain statutorily determined amount of time before being sold. They are taxed at a lower rate than ordinary income to promote investment. The long time horizons of funds allow their returns, including the manager's carried interest, to typically qualify as long-term capital gains. A manager's carried interest can be categorized as capital gains even if the return on the manager's initial investment is higher than the total rate of return for the asset.

Furthermore, taxes on the increase in value of an investor or manager's share of the fund are not due until a realization event occurs, most commonly the sale of an investment.

=== United States ===
Treatment of active partners' return on investment as capital gains in the United States originated in the oil and gas industry of the early 20th century. Oil exploration companies, funded by financial partners' investments, explored and developed hydrocarbon resources. The profits generated were split between the explorers and the investors. The explorers' profits were subject to favorable capital gains treatment alongside the investors. The logic was that the non-financial partner's "sweat equity" was also an investment, since it entailed the risk of loss if the exploration was unsuccessful.

Taxes on carried interest are deferred until a realization event due to the difficulties of measuring the present value of an interest in future profits. The Internal Revenue Service affirmed this approach in 1993 as a general administrative rule, and again in regulations proposed in 2005.

Carried interest is tax advantaged in several other ways as well. Private equity and hedge funds are usually structured as legal partnerships or other pass-through entities for tax purposes, which reduces taxes at the entity level as compared to corporations. That said, investment managers are still taxed on the pass-through income on their individual tax returns. Private equity funds also benefit from the interest deduction although this benefit decreased significantly in 2017 due to changes in the tax law.

The implication of treating private equity carried interest as capital gains is that investment managers face significantly lower tax burdens than others in similar income brackets. As of 2026, the maximum long-term capital gains rate (including the net investment income tax) is 23.8% (20% capital gains plus 3.8% NIIT), compared to the maximum 37% ordinary income rate. This has generated significant criticism.

==== Controversy and regulatory attempts ====
Critics of the carried interest system (as opposed to critics of the broader tax systems that affect private equity) primarily object to the ability of the manager to treat most of their return as capital gains, including amounts above and beyond the amount directly related to the capital contributed by the manager. Critics characterize this as managers taking advantage of tax loopholes to receive what is effectively a salary without paying the 37% marginal ordinary income tax rate. However, some feel this criticism is not appropriate for small businesses that are not blind pools as the manager did risk capital prior to the partnership formation. This controversy has been ongoing since the mid-2000s and has increased as the growth in assets under management by private equity and hedge funds has driven up manager compensation. The Congressional Budget Office estimated that taxing carried interest as ordinary income would raise about $12 billion over ten years.

On June 22, 2007, U.S. Representative Sander M. Levin (D-MI) introduced H.R. 2834, which would have eliminated the ability of managers to receive capital-gains tax treatment on their income. On June 27, 2007, Henry Paulson said that altering the tax treatment of a single industry raises tax policy concerns, and that changing the way partnerships in general are taxed is something that should only be done after careful consideration, although he was not speaking only about carried interest. In July 2007 the U.S. Treasury Department addressed carried interest in testimony before the U.S. Senate Finance Committee. U.S. Representative Charles B. Rangel included a revised version of H.R. 2834 as part of the "Mother of All Tax Reform" and the 2007 House extenders package.

In 2009, the Obama Administration included a line item on taxing carried interest at ordinary income rates in the 2009 Budget Blueprint. On April 2, 2009, Congressman Levin introduced a revised version of the carried interest legislation as H.R. 1935. Proposals were made by the Obama Administration for the 2010, 2011, and 2012 budgets.

Favorable taxation for carried interest generated national interest during the 2012 Republican primary race for president because 31% of presidential candidate Mitt Romney's 2010 and 2011 income was carried interest. Billionaire Warren Buffett, who also benefits from the capital gains system, famously opined that he should not be paying lower taxes than his assistant. On May 28, 2010, the House approved carried interest legislation as part of amendments to the Senate-passed version of H.R. 4213. On February 14, 2012, Congressman Levin introduced H.R. 4016. On February 26, 2014, House Committee on Ways and Means chairman Dave Camp (R-MI) released draft legislation to raise the tax on carried interest from the current 23.8 percent to 35 percent.

In June 2015, Levin introduced the Carried Interest Fairness Act of 2015 (H.R. 2889) to tax investment advisers with ordinary income tax rates. As of 2015, some in the private equity and hedge fund industries had been lobbying against changes, being among the biggest political donors on both sides of the aisle. In June 2016, presidential candidate Hillary Clinton said that if Congress were to fail to act, as president she would ask the Treasury Department to use its regulatory authority to end a tax advantage.

In 2018, under President Donald Trump's administration, tax legislation passed that increased the length of time assets must be held by investment managers in order to qualify for long-term capital gains treatment from one year to three years. The legislation also limited the amount of interest deduction that could be taken to 30% of earnings before interest and taxes. The new rule had many exceptions including excepting the real estate sector. Proposed Treasury guidance in August 2020 tightened certain of these exceptions.

In 2022, a proposal to narrow the carried interest loophole as part of the Inflation Reduction Act of 2022 was removed to allow the act to pass, reportedly due to "a last-minute intervention by Senator Kyrsten Sinema of Arizona."

=== United Kingdom ===
The Finance Act 1972 provided that gains on investments acquired by reason of rights or opportunities offered to individuals as directors or employees were, subject to various exceptions, taxed as income and not capital gains. This may strictly have applied to the carried interests of many venture-capital executives, even if they were partners and not employees of the investing fund, because they were often directors of the investee companies. In 1987, the Inland Revenue and the British Venture Capital Association (BVCA) entered into an agreement which provided that in most circumstances gains on carried interest were not taxed as income.

The Finance Act 2003 widened the circumstances in which investment gains were treated as employment-related and therefore taxed as income. In 2003, the Inland Revenue and the BVCA entered into a new agreement which had the effect that, notwithstanding the new legislation, most carried-interest gains continued to be taxed as capital gains and not as income. Such capital gains were generally taxed at 10% as opposed to a 40% rate on income.

In 2007, the favorable tax rates on carried interest attracted political controversy. It was said that cleaners paid taxes at a higher rate than the private equity executives whose offices they cleaned. The outcome was that the capital-gains tax rules were reformed, increasing the rate on gains to 18%, but carried interest continued to be taxed as gains and not as income.

== See also ==
- Taxation of private equity and hedge funds
