= Accounting constraints =

Accounting constraints (also known as the constraints of accounting) are the practical limitations and guidelines that influence how financial statements are prepared and interpreted. These constraints acknowledge that ideal accounting practices may need to be adjusted due to factors like the availability of reliable information, the cost of providing it, and the need to balance accuracy with timeliness.

Common accounting constraints include objectivity (requiring verifiable evidence), the cost-benefit principle (weighing the cost of information against its usefulness), materiality (focusing on significant information), consistency (applying the same methods over time), industry practices (following accepted norms within a specific sector), timeliness (reporting information promptly), and conservatism (avoiding overstatement of assets and profits). They help ensure that financial reporting is both useful and practical.

Accounting constraints is not to be confused with constraints accounting, the latter of which, much like throughput accounting or cost accounting, is a method of accounting.

== Types of Constraints ==
=== Objectivity ===
The constraint of objectivity deals with the issue of needing objective, verifiable evidence.

=== Costs and benefits ===
The costs and benefits constraint, also called the cost-effectiveness constraint, is pervasive throughout the framework. Companies must spend time and money to provide financial statements. To be more specific, costs can constrain the range of information when providing financial reporting on the grounds that the companies must "collect, process, analyze and disseminate relevant information" which need time and money.

For investors, they want to know all financial information if possible in ideal condition, which may cause tremendous financial burden in the corporations. Moreover, some financial information may not be valuable for external users to acquire a huge benefit, for example, how much money does a company spend for its greening of headquarters. Therefore, while deciding the components of financial reporting, companies need to measure the sense of particular financial information and the expenditure of providing particular information and the benefits they can acquire from this particular information. Properly speaking, if the costs in particular information exceed the benefit they can acquire, companies may choose not to disclose this particular information. For example, if there is a $0.1 difference between checkbook register and bank statement, accountant should ignore the $0.1 rather than waste time and money to find the $0.1.

=== Materiality ===
Companies need to consider materiality when providing financial information. Particularly, companies must disclose the material information which can influence the financial performance and some immaterial information can be excluded. For example, a company owns $10 million net assets and therefore a default of customer with $1000 is immateriality and in contrast if the amount of default is $2 million, which can influence the financial decisions and thus means material. However, there are also some small items which can transfer net profit to net loss and these item can be considered as material items. In order to judge whether the information is material or not, companies can based on the following materiality process:

==== Define purpose and scope ====
Expected:

- Know well about your objectives: think about what you will do with the outcome of materiality process and objectives can be future trends or target setting area etc.;
- Take your audience into consideration: who important for your financial report and who will read it;
- Define the meaning of materiality for your company: the importance to stakeholder and is it relevant to your company;
- Defence the scope of material topics in your company: which parts of your business will be covered in this assessment?

Advanced:

- Embed materiality: consider the materiality results when making business plans;

==== Identify Potential Topics ====
Expected:

- Check sources to make a long list of possible material topics: internal data, external review or media reporting, etc.;
- Assign responsibility: which team should be involved when making possible material topics: such as senior management team;
- Contain both risks and opportunities such as cost savings or efficiency gains;
- Take external stakeholder engagement into consideration: the impact and valuable feedback you can acquire from stakeholders;

Advanced:

- Invest in a digital solution: collect and store documentation;
- Establish a sustained process: capture long term changes for material topics;

==== Categorise ====
Expected:

- Classify the potential materiality themes into Categories such as group, country, etc.;
- Check whether the topics are on the same level or not;
- Align topics name based on the policies and strategies of your organization;
- Each employee involved in this process need to understand the specific risks and opportunities;

Advanced:

- Connect each material topic with relevant external changes;
- Consider how material topics can influence each other or overlap;

==== Gather information about the impact and importance of topics ====
Excepted:

- Research every materiality theme and find the correlations between topics and business in terms of social, economic and environmental impacts;
- Gather information about each material topics which can be used to prioritize the topics in next phase;

Advanced:

- Utilise Methodology such as KPMG True Value to quantify social, economic and environmental impacts;

==== Prioritise ====
Expected:

- Prioritise material topics by:
  - Identifying relevant business functions and choosing which internal stakeholders need to be joined in prioritizing topics.
  - Utilising the methodology developed in phase 4 to ‘score’ each topic.
  - "Setting a threshold or cut-off point for de ning which topics will be considered material".

Advanced:

- Connect with enterprise risk management function;

==== Engage management ====
Expected:

- Materiality assessment need to be signed off by senior business manager;
- It is important to do the review which makes the process reliable;

Advanced:

- Send the materiality assessment's outcomes to the board of directors;
- Include some social trends into outcomes, which can make the assessment into wider corporate strategy process;

==== Seek stakeholder feedback ====
Expected:

- Identify which kind of stakeholders need to review the material topics and evaluate the outcomes;
- Acquired feedback form stakeholders;

Advanced:

- Connect the results of materiality assessment with company strategies and operations;

=== Consistency ===
Accounting statements made over a long period of time should be consistent or similar to one another. If they are formatted similarly then comparisons can more easily be made between these documents.

=== Industry Practices ===
Industry Practices is a less dominant constraint compared to cost-benefit and materiality in financial reporting. This constraints means in some industries, it is hard and costly to calculate the production costs and therefore companies in these particular industries choose to only report the current market prices instead of production costs. For example, in agriculture industry, calculating cost per crop is difficult and expensive and hence they choose to report the price in the current market which is easier for farmers.

=== Conservatism ===
Accountants estimate the transactions and then choose whether to record the transactions or not based on their own judgment. In terms of that, conservatism is helpful for accountants to make a choice between two similar alternatives and it makes accountants choose to record the less optimistic choice. For example, If there is a possibility that customers will sue the company and they may also not to sue the company. In this case, accountants need to disclose this situation to investors.

Moreover, the Conservatism is also a less dominated constraint, which means firms also need to consider more about bad news than good news when reporting financial statements. In particular, firms need to choose the method that "least likely overstates assets and income or understates liabilities and losses" when encountering accounting issues. For example, if the staff believe there will be 2% bad debt in terms of receivables based on historical information and another staff believe there will be 5% because of a sudden drop, the company needs to use the 5% figure when providing financial statements.

=== Timeliness ===
Perhaps most obviously, statements should be relevant in terms of date. Quarterly reports should not be made available only on a half-year basis, as some of the information in the report would not be very useful.

=== Financial Constraint ===
Financial Constraint is defined as a temporary restriction of internally generated funds which may require resources to be cut for investments including marketing resources, so that managers can achieve their financial goals.

During the past two decades, researchers have conducted a large number of empirical studies related to financial constraints, and the measurements they use have generated controversy, Fazari et al. (1987) in their seminal work, find a positive relationship between resources available for investment and cash flow. Because external financing, such as taking on debt or acquiring capital, is not immediately available, such firms are heavily dependent on their internal cash flow. However, many research papers show doubt on the idea that the relationship between investment and cash flow indicates financial constraint. The authors of another seminal study on the subject, Kaplan and Zingales (1997), find that firms classified as having financial constraint, such as in Fazzari et al (1987), appear to have less constriction and less sensitivity to cash flow, which contradicts the initial hypothesis. Therefore, Kaplan and Zingales (1997) and Whited and Wu (2006) present new financial-constriction indexes. Whited and Wu (2006) develop a widely use financial constriction called index WW. Despite controversy regarding financial constraint measurement, the literature recognizes its generalized use of cash flow as measure of financial constraint.

Recent research demonstrates that financial constraint is continue present in firms from The US and Latin America. The uncertain and volatile environment of global markets causes companies financial constraints. In addition to the fact that financial markets have increased the pressure on companies to obtain positive short-term results, in a situation of financial constraint, managers generally address this situation by decreasing the intensity of marketing to show acceptable short-term results to shareholders; however, these decisions impact negatively the long-term firm value.
