= Sam McAughtry =

Irish-British writer (1921–2014)

- Born: Samuel Jamison McAughtry; 24 March 1921; Belfast, Ireland
- Died: 28 March 2014 (aged 93)
- Spouse: Phyllis McAughtry
- Children: 3

Senator
- In office 23 February 1996 – 17 September 1997
- Constituency: Industrial and Commercial Panel

Personal details
- Party: Independent

Sam McAughtry (24 March 1921 – 28 March 2014) was an Irish / British writer, broadcaster and raconteur.

== Biography ==
=== Early life ===
Samuel Jamison McAughtry was born at 130 Cosgrave Street, Belfast, Ireland, on 24 March 1921, approximately six weeks before the country's partition. He was the son of Marriot McAughtry, a fireman, and Elizabeth Condit. He was brought up in the loyalist Tiger's Bay area of Belfast and was educated at St Barnabas'.

=== Formative years ===
He left school at 14 and during the Second World War he served in the Royal Air Force. On leaving the armed forces, in 1946 he applied to join the Royal Ulster Constabulary, sitting his entrance exam at the Union Theological College, Belfast, he used as the topic for his essay town life versus country life alluding to rural life in Greece from where he'd recently returned and with particular emphasis on how young women were involved in the making of wine by crushing grapes with their bare feet. Having successfully passed the entrance exam his ambition was to become a plain clothes detective, however during his interview with a senior officer it was pointed out to him that his initial posting would be to a rural area, where among his main duties he was to expect to have to help the local farmers fill in their agricultural census in order to record the makeup of their farm.

Unimpressed with the prospect he decided not to join the police. He undertook a career as a civil servant, ironically carrying out the correlation of agricultural census papers from rural areas, before becoming a full-time writer.

=== Later life ===
Describing himself as a hybrid unionist McAughtry was a trade union representative and a member of the Northern Ireland Labour Party. Using this political platform he stood unsuccessfully for elections as a non-sectarian socialist. McAughtry was a founding member of the Peace Train Organisation, which protested against the bombing of the Dublin–Belfast railway line and in which he undertook the role of chairman.

He made many contributions to radio and television programmes, giving his memories of life in Belfast as well as political analysis during the troubles. He was also a regular columnist in The Irish Times.

In 1996, McAughtry was elected a member of the Seanad Éireann, on the Industrial and Commercial Panel, succeeding the late Seán Fallon. Others from Northern Ireland such as Gordon Wilson, Maurice Hayes, John Robb, Sam Kyle, Seamus Mallon and Bríd Rodgers were nominated by the Taoiseach.

He was introduced on 28 February 1996, welcomed as a rare northern Protestant representative, and made his first contribution in response in which he stated:

"It is my dearest wish to see this island inhabited by five million Irish people, living in two jurisdictions with consent, but with institutions established to emphasise their Irishness."

— Sam McAughtry

=== Death ===
McAughtry died on 28 March 2014. He was survived by his three daughters, and by his wife, Phyllis.

== Works ==
- The Sinking of The Kenbane Head (1977), an autobiography
- Play It Again Sam (1978)
- Blind Spot (1979)
- Sam McAughtry's Belfast (1981), a collection of sketches
- McAughtry's War (1985), autobiography and autobiographical fiction
- Hillman Street High Roller (1994), autobiography and autobiographical fiction
- Down in the Free State (1987), a travel book
- Belfast Stories (1993)
- Touch and Go (1993), a novel
- On the outside looking in, A Memoir (2003)
- "A Wistful Eye on Titanic" (2012) A review of the 2012 novel 'A Wistful Eye - The Tragedy of a Titanic Shipwright' written by his cousin DJ Kelly (Denise Beddows).
