= Sales (accounting) =

Type of company operating revenue

In bookkeeping, accounting, and financial accounting, net sales are operating revenues earned by a company for selling its products or rendering its services. Also referred to as revenue, they are reported directly on the income statement as Sales or Net sales.

In financial ratios that use income statement sales values, "sales" refers to net sales, not gross sales. Sales are the unique transactions that occur in professional selling or during marketing initiatives.

Revenue is earned when goods are delivered or services are rendered. The term sales in a marketing, advertising or a general business context often refers to a free in which a buyer has agreed to purchase some products at a set time in the future. From an accounting standpoint, sales do not occur until the product is delivered. "Outstanding orders" refers to sales orders that have not been filled.

Consulting fee.	20000

A sale is a transfer of property for money or credit. In double-entry bookkeeping, a sale of merchandise is recorded in the general journal as a debit to cash or accounts receivable and a credit to the sales account. The amount recorded is the actual monetary value of the transaction, not the list price of the merchandise. A discount from list price might be noted if it applies to the sale.

Fees for services are recorded separately from sales of merchandise, but the bookkeeping transactions for recording "sales" of services are similar to those for recording sales of tangible goods.

== Gross sales and net sales ==
$\text{Net sales}=\text{Gross sales} - \text{(Customer discounts, returns, allowances)}$

General Journal - Merchandise return example
Date	Description of entry	Debit	Credit
8-7	Sales returns and allowances	20.00	
	Accounts receivable		20.00
	Full credit for customer return of merchandise purchased on account.		
8-7	Inventory	15.00	
	Cost of goods sold		15.00
	Restore returned merchandise to inventory.		

Gross sales are the sum of all sales during a time period. Net sales are gross sales minus sales returns, sales allowances, and sales discounts. Gross sales do not normally appear on an income statement. The sales figures reported on an income statement are net sales.

- sales returns are refunds to customers for returned merchandise / credit notes
- debit notes
- sales journal entries non-current, current batch processed transactions predictive analytics in strategic management/administration/governance research metaframeworks
- sales allowances are reductions in sales price for merchandise with minor defects, the allowance agreed upon after the customer has purchased the merchandise (see also credit note)
- sales discounts allowed are reduced payments from the customer based on invoice payment terms such as 2/10, n/30 (2% discount if paid within 10 days, net invoice total due in 30 days)
- interest received for amounts in arrears
- inc/exc amounts capital goods&services, non-capital goods&services input valued added tax, with cost of non-capital goods sold

input vat - output vat

sales of portfolio items and capital gains taxes

Sales Returns and Allowances and Sales Discounts are contra-revenue accounts.

In a survey of nearly 200 senior marketing managers, 70 percent responded that they found the "sales total" metric very useful.

General Journal - Sales discount example
Date	Description of entry	Debit	Credit
9-1	Accounts Receivable (Customer A)	500.00	
	Sales		500.00
	Merchandise sale on account, terms 2/10, n/30.		
9-7	Cash	490.00	
	Sales Discounts	10.00	
	Accounts Receivable (Customer A)		500.00
	A/R paid by Customer A, taking a 2% discount.		

Revenue or Sales reported on the income statement are net sales after deducting Sales Returns and Allowances and Sales Discounts.

Revenue:		
Sales		$2,000.00
Less Sales returns and allowances	$20.00	
Sales discounts	$10.00	$30.00
Net sales		$1,970.00

== Unique definitions ==
When the US government reports wholesale sales, this includes excise taxes on certain products.

== Other terms ==
Net sales = gross sales – (customer discounts, returns, and allowances)
Gross profit = net sales – cost of goods sold
Operating profit = gross profit – total operating expenses
Net profit = operating profit – taxes – interest
Net profit = net sales – cost of goods sold – operating expense – taxes – interest
