= Gross margin return on inventory investment =

In business, Gross Margin Return on Inventory Investment (GMROII, also GMROI) is a ratio which expresses a seller's return on each unit of currency spent on inventory. It is one way to determine how profitable the seller's inventory is, and describes the relationship between the profit earned from total sales, and the amount invested in the inventory sold. Generally for a seller, the higher the GMROII the better. Since inventory is a very widely ranging factor in a seller's investment in working capital, it is important for the seller to know how much he might expect to gain from it. The GMROII answers the question "for each unit of average inventory held at cost, how many units of currency of gross profit I generated in one year?" GMROII is traditionally calculated by using one year's gross profit against the average of 12 or 13 units of inventory at cost. GMROII may vary depending on which segment is being analyzed (e.g. women's apparel, toys, home, sportswear, etc.), but a rule of thumb is that a GMROII of typical retailer is above 3.0.

== GMROII in the retail industry ==
GMROII is particularly important in the wholesale and retail industries, but it is used relatively less frequently in manufacturing. In retail, the measure can be used to assess the performance of an individual stock keeping unit, a retail department or the complete business. As stock turn (i.e. sales units divided by average inventory units) and Gross Margin Percent can vary heavily by item, market segment, location, and period, GMROII can act as the main driver for retailers to analyze their product and store offering. This metric does not suffer from the major disadvantages some of the other main performance metrics do.

For example:

- Products or stores with high sales often have lower margin or excessive inventory
- Products with a high stock turns often have a low margin
- High margin items are often slow sellers and thus produce low profits
- High profit products often have low margin, high volume sales, but also high inventory levels that prevent other products from being displayed and sold

Retailers usually drive their business based on sales or margin. For a retailer whose budgets and bonuses are based on sales, employees often achieve that by lowering the margin or putting too much stock in their stores. A high GMROII indicates a good balance of sales, margin, and inventory cost.

== GMROII in manufacturing ==
It has been suggested that GMROII is used less often in a manufacturing context because it is difficult to associate raw material inventory with specific products sold.

== Average GMROII ==
Financial textbooks often show a formula with a yearly or monthly calculation. When tactical decisions are required for variable time periods, it is helpful for systems to be set up so that GMROII can be analyzed at either the yearly, monthly, or weekly level. Due to the textbook GMROII formula, depending on the time period, a different result would occur.

For example:

- ($100,000 annual profit) / ($25,000 average inventory cost) = GMROII of 4.0
- ($8,000 July profit) / ($25,000 average inventory cost) = GMROII of 0.32
- ($4,000 first two weeks of July profit) / ($25,000 average inventory cost) = GMROII of 0.16

Therefore, it is advantageous to use Average Weekly GMROII which takes time out of the picture. That way, the retailer looks at similar types of numbers regardless of how many weeks are being looked at. The formula is: Average Weekly GMROII = (Profits for the total time period) / (Sum of week ending inventory cost value)

== Alternative Formulas for GMROII ==
Other formulas that are often given for GMROII are the following (note that all of these are mathematically equivalent because all can be reduced down to Margin/Avg_Inventory_cost):
$(Margin \% / (100\% - Margin \%) ) * Annual Inventory Turns$
$(Margin/COGS) * Annual Inventory Turns$
$Margin \% * (Sales / Avg Inventory Cost)$
In the formulas used here, "Margin %" refers to margin as a percent of sales, "Annual Inventory Turns" refers to COGS / Avg Inventory Cost.

== American Levi's GMROII ==
American Levi's GMROII is a hybrid of GMROII and GMROS (Gross Margin Return On Space) that takes the selling price of an article into account:
$Selling Price * GMROII$
$Selling Price * Margin \% * Annual Inventory Turns$
When deciding whether to stock jeans in a retail store, it makes more sense for Levi's to sell jeans for $100 rather than jeans for $10, if they both have the same conventional GMROII. By using the American Levi's GMROII, you see that the $100 jeans deliver 10 times the margin dollars on the space occupied by each pair of jeans in stock, compared to the $10 jeans. Net Profit will increase more than 10 times due to operating leverage.

Note that GMROS can be calculated by multiplying American Levi's GMROII by Density (Units per square foot). Gross Margin Dollars per Square Foot: $American Levi's GMROII * Density$

== Shortcomings ==
GMROI has been described as one of the few business measures for which "it is virtually impossible to set a precise goal", and the costs of holding inventory are not taken into account.

Another shortcoming of GMROII-driven analysis is that items with high sell-offs (i.e. the final stock level falls towards zero) appear better than items with constant inventory supplies. Fashionable items that totally sold off will appear better than basic items such as black socks that are replenished by reorders. This is particularly evident when analyzing shorter time periods or item level information rather than higher level (department) information.
