= Cost of revenue =

Cost of revenue is the total of all costs incurred directly in producing and distributing the products and services of a company to customers.

Cost of revenue can be found in the company income statement. Generally, any costs that are directly connected with manufacturing and distribution of goods and services can be added to cost of revenue (i.e. direct costs). Indirect costs (e.g. depreciation, salaries paid to management or other fixed costs) are excluded.

Cost of revenue is different from Costs of Goods Sold (COGS) in that it includes costs such as distribution and sales commissions.

== Example ==
Definition of cost of revenue from the annual report of an internet-based company:

"Cost of revenue: Our cost of revenue consists primarily of expenses associated with the delivery and distribution of our products. These include expenses related to the operation of our data centers, such as facility and server equipment depreciation, energy and bandwidth costs, and salaries, benefits, and share-based compensation for employees on our operations teams. Cost of revenue also includes credit card and other transaction fees related to processing customer transactions, amortization of intangible assets, costs associated with data partner arrangements, and cost of virtual reality platform device inventory sold."

Cost of revenue can also be found on such resources as Yahoo! Finance and Google Finance.
