= Constraints accounting =

Accounting technique or strategy

Constraints accounting is an accounting technique, much like throughput accounting, which focuses on ongoing improvement and implementation of the theory of constraints. It includes an explicit consideration of the role of constraints, a specification of throughput contribution effects, and the decoupling of throughput from operational expenses.

Contrasting constraints accounting to cost accounting, while cost accounting focuses on price per unit, constraints accounting focuses on price per unit-of-time. This measure is known as 'product octane.' Maximizing octane can greatly increase profitability.

Constraints accounting is not to be confused with accounting constraints, which are general limitations in the field of accounting.
