= General partner =

Managerial actor on behalf of a business

General partner is a person who joins with at least one other person to form a business. A general partner has responsibility for the actions of the business, can legally bind the business and is personally liable for all the partnership's debts and obligations.

== Role of a general partner ==
A general partner acts on behalf of a business, and generally has the power to make decisions with or without the permission of the other partners. Due to their managerial role general partners have unlimited liability, which means that a partnership's general partners are personally responsible for all business debts, meaning that the personal assets of general partners are at potential risk for the debts of the partnership.

In the event that a partnership is dissolved, general partners are subject to liquidation, such that their share of the assets of the partnership may be distributed to claimants such as creditors before the partner receives any remaining share.

== General partner v. limited partner ==
Unlike general partners, limited partners enjoy limited liability, meaning that limited partners are not personally liable for the debts and obligations of the partnership and their personal assets cannot be reached to satisfy business debts. General partners have unlimited personal liability for business debts.

The protection against liability enjoyed by limited partners comes at the cost of management power. General partners are actively involved with management of the partnership, while limited partners do not have any management power or decision-making authority for the partnership. Limited partners may have a role in the business, outside of the scope of making or influencing business management or operations.

General partners are able to make decisions that are fully and legally binding to the partnership, but limited partners do not have that authority. Taxation is also different between limited and general partners.

In private equity and venture capital funds organised as limited partnerships, the general partner typically earns an annual management fee on committed capital and a performance share of fund profits known as carried interest, while limited partners commit capital and receive distributions of returned capital and their share of profits after the general partner's share is paid.

== Worldwide ==
=== France ===
Article 1832 of the Civil Code in France, describes a partnership under the French Commercial Code. Just like the United States, a general partnership consists of general partners, who are personally liable for all of the business debts and claims. Furthermore, taxation is based on individual partners, rather than the partnership being taxed through income or corporate tax. Partnerships in France are also considered as separate legal personalities.

=== India ===
The Indian Partnership Act of 1932, was a law that described partnerships based in India, which was the relationship between individuals who have decided to share profits of a business. An interesting note about partnerships in India, is the fact that status does not relate to a formation of partnerships. In order to have a partnership that is recognized, the people who are engaged must enter a formal contract. Furthermore, partners who engage in a general partnership, are also called general partners, who have unlimited liability.

=== Japan ===
In Japan, general partnerships are called Kumiai. They are made up of general partners, whom have unlimited liability, like in the United States, meaning general partners are fully responsible for any and all business debts and claims. This was founded under Civil Code Act No. 89 of 1896, in which it describes general partnerships as an engagement between partners who decide to jointly run a business. Although no formal proceedings are necessary to enter a partnership agreement, general partners are taxed with a "pass-through" taxation. Japan does not consider general partnerships as separate legal entities.

=== United Kingdom ===
The Partnership Act 1890, which was an act of Parliament of the United Kingdom, governing the rights and duties of people and corporate entities conducting a partnership, was the first law allowing for partnerships. In the United Kingdom, general partners within a general partnership are personally liable for any and all business debts and claims. Business profits and losses are shared between all partners and each partner would be taxed individually on their share, which is similar to the "pass-through" taxation.

==== Scotland ====
Unlike the rest of the United Kingdom, in Scotland general partnerships are considered separate legal personalities, meaning a general partnership entity is able to do things such as, own assets in its own name, borrow money and grant security of assets that are within its own name and, bring issues to court in its own name.

=== United States ===
In the United States, general partners enjoy pass-through taxation, which allows business profits and losses to be passed through to its owners instead of being taxable to the business entity itself. Limited partners do not have to pay self-employment taxes on profits that they receive from the partnership because they are not considered as active members of the company, while general partners pay self-employment taxes on their share of profits.

There are four types of partnerships, the general partnership, the limited partnership, the limited liability partnership, and the limited liability limited partnership. Three varieties of partnership, the general partnership, limited partnership, and limited liability limited partnership, require that a general partner or general partners be designated upon formation.
