= Cycle count =

Inventory auditing procedure

A cycle count is a perpetual inventory auditing procedure that involves counting a small, specific subset of inventory in a continuous, regularly repeated sequence. It serves as an alternative to the physical inventory method, where a business must temporarily halt operations to count all items simultaneously. By focusing on a subset of items, cycle counting is less disruptive to daily operations.

== ABC analysis ==
Most cycle counting applications use ABC analysis, segregating items into various count frequencies using the Pareto method (see below).

== Method ==
There are several methods of selecting which items to count and with what frequency, and each method has strengths and weaknesses.

=== Pareto method ===
The Pareto method, derived from the Pareto principle, is to cycle count inventory by percentage of inventory value. Items with a higher determined value are counted more often, while items that have little movement are seldom counted. This approach is usually based on value which appeals to accountants by minimizing the variance in inventory value. The analysis may also be based on usage from an operational point of view. This is perceived as being more efficient from a supply chain management perspective by concentrating effort on higher volume of use items. The main shortcoming is that low value items may be ignored and cause an entire assembly line to halt while a minor component is re-ordered.

=== Hybrid ===
There are also hybrids of the ABC method. The most common would be to use [cost*usage] and adjusted based on certain criteria which are critical to the organization's performance.

=== Cycle counting by usage only ===
Cycle counting by usage states that items more frequently accessed should be counted more often, irrespective of value. Every time an item is added or removed, there is a risk of introducing inventory variance. Logical inventory zones can be set up to distinguish items depending on how frequently they are touched. This method may be biased against counting higher value inventory or require additional counting to satisfy accounting requirements.

=== Opportunity based ===
This method conducts inventory checks at key points in the material management process. The inventory is audited at re-order points, when a certain amount is used, or when inventory levels are low.

=== Statistical Process Control ===
This method uses statistical process control to audit items with the highest chance of inventory inaccuracy.

=== Geographic ===
Also known as "location based" or "by surface area". Cycle counting that begins from one end of the company to the other. Combing over each rack or shelf, that is assigned per counter. This method may require planning, in which a map of the company is required and counting forms for the recording of stock information that will then need updating to the inventory management system.

== Best practices ==
The basic process of cycle counting is generate list, audit, review, repeat. It is considered important to the success of any cycle counting program to have 6S in place prior to beginning.

=== Organize ===
The implementation of a 6S culture is important.

- Segregate scrap, expired, and non-conforming materials from good inventory.
- Store items in an orderly matter. Inventory should be properly identified and stacked evenly in the proper location.
- Everything should be clean and without clutter.
- Bulk items have standard pack sizes and WIP quantities are controlled.
- The stored items have limited access. Responsibility of inventory transactions are defined and clearly understood. Develop specialists that are proficient in auditing inventory and finding solutions to inventory errors.
- Conduct and record daily safety observations to ensure auditors are not at risk of injury.

=== Generate a list ===
Produce a list of items to audit according to the method best suited for the company.

=== Audit ===
Verify quantities using trained personnel.

=== Review ===
- Define any problems.
- Measure by increasing the regularity of counts for items that may be affected by perceived problem.
- Analyze the data collected from the repeated counts.
- Improve or design a process to bring inventory accuracy into acceptable tolerances.
- Control or verify the performance of the improved process.

== Automation ==
To conduct efficient and accurate cycle counts, many organizations use some form of software to implement an inventory control system, which is part of a warehouse management system. These systems may include mobile computers with integrated barcode scanners that allow the operator to automatically identify items, and enter inventory counts via keypad. The software transmits data to a database on a host system which can generate inventory reports.

Based on user defined criteria, the software will select a number of items to count at specific locations for the specified period of time. Ideally, these selections are daily but many companies choose to generate cycle count items weekly.

Many companies perform "mini" physical inventories also referred to as "cycle counts". Instead of using random or system generated part numbers at specific locations to count, they selectively choose specific locations and count everything in those locations. As part of their procedures they rotate throughout the plant with the intention of counting every location a minimum of once each year. This is an effective alternative to true cycle counting where a company may not have the sophistication to utilize cycle counting software.

== Risks ==
Cycle counts, like traditional physical inventory counts, can introduce inventory errors if the process is poorly executed. Multiple locations per item, work in process, and lag in paperwork processing can each contribute to errors. This problem can be mitigated with correct cycle count procedures that specify not only the part number to be counted but also the location it should be in. Some experts believe that cycle counting is only effective in companies with a well-defined inventory control procedure and a high degree of inventory accuracy but this has proven not to be true in practice.

Cycle counts should only be conducted by trained and tested personnel to reduce the risks of inventory loss. Physical counts typically count all inventory in a fixed location and later reconcile with the inventory control system. A cycle count may, but not necessarily, start with the inventory control system and reconciles to locations. It is an important distinction when deciding who carries out the audit and how well trained they are. For example, if inventory exists in location A, B, and C and someone physically moves C to D without transaction, the inventory control system will continue to show inventory in A, B, and C. At the time of cycle count, the control system will direct the counter to A, B, and C where they will find C missing. Unless inventory in D, which could be anywhere, is discovered, C runs the risk of being adjusted to 0 and written off. This is why it is important to only use personnel with a proven ability (through testing) to conduct the audits correctly. If the personnel performing the counts is not taken seriously, D may not be picked up unless a physical count is performed so, an operation that relies only on untrained personnel conducting the cycle counts is likely to experience a net loss of inventory.
