= Gross income =

Sum of all earnings before taxes

For households and individuals, gross income is the sum of all wages, salaries, profits, interest payments, rents, and other forms of earnings, before any deductions or taxes. It is opposed to net income, defined as the gross income minus taxes and other deductions (e.g., mandatory pension contributions).

For a business, gross income (also gross profit, sales profit, or credit sales) is the difference between revenue and the cost of making a product or providing a service, before deducting overheads, payroll, taxation, and interest payments. This is different from operating profit (earnings before interest and taxes). Gross margin is often used interchangeably with gross profit, but the terms are different. When speaking about a monetary amount, it is technically correct to use the term "gross profit", but when referring to a percentage or ratio, it is correct to use "gross margin".

== Relationship with other accounting terms ==
The various deductions (and their corresponding metrics) leading from net sales to net income are as follows:

Net sales = gross sales – (customer discounts + returns + allowances)
Gross profit = net sales – cost of goods sold (Note: Cost of goods sold is calculated differently for a merchandising business and for a manufacturer)
Gross margin = [(net sales – cost of goods sold)/net sales] × 100%.
Operating profit = gross profit – total operating expenses
Net income (or net profit) = operating profit – taxes – interest

== United States ==
Under United States income tax law, gross income serves as the starting point for determining Federal and state income tax of individuals, corporations, estates and trusts, whether resident or non-resident.

Under the U.S. Internal Revenue Code, "Except as otherwise provided" by law, gross income means "all income from whatever source derived," and is not limited to cash received. Federal tax regulations interpret this general rule. The amount of income recognized is generally the value received or the value which the taxpayer has a right to receive. Certain types of income are specifically excluded from gross income for tax purposes.

The time at which gross income becomes taxable is determined under Federal tax rules, which differ in some cases from financial accounting rules.

=== What is income? ===
Individuals, corporations, members of partnerships, estates, trusts, and their beneficiaries ("taxpayers") are subject to income tax in the United States. The amount on which tax is computed, taxable income, equals gross income less allowable tax deductions.

The Internal Revenue Code gives specific examples. The examples are not all inclusive. The term "income" is not defined in the statute or regulations. An early Supreme Court case stated, "Income may be defined as the gain derived from capital, from labor, or from both combined, provided it is understood to include profit gained through a sale or conversion of capital assets." The court also held that the amount of gross income on disposition of property is the proceeds less the basis (usually, the acquisition cost) of the property.

Gross income is not limited to cash received: it includes "income realized in any form, whether money, property, or services".

Following are some of the things that are included in income:

- Wages, fees for services, tips, and similar income. It is well established that income from personal services must be included in the gross income of the person who performs the services. Mere assignment of the income does not shift the liability for the tax.
- Interest received, as well as imputed interest on below market and gift loans.
- Dividends, including capital gain distributions, from corporations.
- Gross profit from sale of inventory. The sales price, net of discounts, less cost of goods sold is included in income.
- Gains on disposition of other property. Gain is measured as the excess of proceeds over the taxpayer's adjusted basis in the property. Losses from property may be allowed as tax deductions.
- Rents and royalties from use of tangible or intangible property. The full amount of rent or royalty is included in income, and expenses incurred to produce this income may be allowed as tax deductions.
- Alimony and separate maintenance payments.
- Pensions, annuities, and income from life insurance or endowment contracts.
- Distributive share of partnership income or pro rata share of income of an S corporation.
- State and local income tax refunds, to the extent previously deducted. These are generally excluded from gross income for state and local income tax purposes.
- Any other income from whatever source. Even income from crimes is taxable and must be reported, as failure to do so is a crime in itself.

Gifts and inheritances are not considered income to the recipient under U.S. law. However, gift or estate tax may be imposed on the donor or the estate of the decedent.

=== Year of inclusion ===
A taxpayer must include Income as part of taxable income in the year recognized under the taxpayer's method of accounting. Generally, a taxpayer using the cash method of accounting (cash basis taxpayer) recognizes income when received. A taxpayer using the accrual method (accrual basis taxpayer) recognizes income when earned. Income is generally considered earned:

- on sales of property when title to the property passes to the purchaser, and
- on performance of services when the services are performed

=== Amount of income ===
For a cash method taxpayer, the measure of income is generally the amount of money or fair market value of property received. For an accrual method taxpayer, it includes the amount the taxpayer has a right to receive.

Certain specific rules apply, including:

- Constructive receipt,
- Deferral of income from advance payment for goods or services (with exceptions),
- Determination what portion of an annuity is income and what portion is return of capital,

The value of goods or services received is included in income in barter transactions.

=== Exclusions from gross income: U.S. Federal income tax law ===
The courts have given very broad meaning to the phrase "all income from whatever source derived," interpreting it to include all income unless a specific exclusion applies. Certain types of income are specifically excluded from gross income. These may be referred to as exempt income, exclusions, or tax exemptions. Among the more common excluded items are the following:

- 2014-7 Certain Medicaid Waiver Payments May Be Excludable From Income.
- Tax exempt interest. For Federal income tax, interest on state and municipal bonds is excluded from gross income. Some states provide an exemption from state income tax for certain bond interest.
- Some Social Security benefits. The amount exempt has varied by year. The exemption is phased out for individuals with gross income above certain amounts.
- Gifts and inheritances. However, a "gift" from an employer to an employee is considered compensation, and is generally included in gross income.
- Life insurance proceeds received by reason of the death of the insured person.
- Certain compensation for personal physical injury or physical sickness, including:
  - Amounts received under worker's compensation acts for personal physical injuries or physical sickness,
  - Amounts received as damages (other than punitive damages) in a suit or settlement for personal physical injuries or physical sickness,
  - Amounts received through insurance for personal physical injuries or physical sickness, and
  - Amounts received as a pension, annuity, or similar allowance for personal physical injuries or physical sickness resulting from active service in the armed forces.
- Scholarships. Amounts in the nature of compensation, such as for teaching, are included in gross income.
- Certain employee benefits. Non-taxable benefits include group health insurance, group life insurance for policies up to $50,000, and certain fringe benefits, including those under a flexible spending or cafeteria plan.
- Certain elective deferrals of salary (contributions to "401(k)" plans).
- Meals and lodging provided to employees on employer premises for the convenience of the employer.
- Foreign earned income exclusion for U.S. citizens or residents for income earned outside the U.S. when the individual met qualifying tests.
- Income from discharge of indebtedness for insolvent taxpayers or in certain other cases.
- Contributions to capital received by a corporation.
- Gain up to $250,000 ($500,000 on a married joint tax return) on the sale of a personal residence.

There are numerous other specific exclusions. Restrictions and specific definitions apply.

Some state rules provide for different inclusions and exclusions.

=== Source of income ===
United States persons (including citizens, residents (whether U.S. citizens or aliens residing in the United States), and U.S. corporations) are generally subject to U.S. federal income tax on their worldwide income. Nonresident aliens are subject to U.S. federal income tax only on income from a U.S. business and certain income from United States sources. Source of income is determined based on the type of income. The source of compensation income is the place where the services giving rise to the income were performed. The source of certain income, such as dividends and interest, is based on location of the residence of the payor. The source of income from property is based on the location where the property is used. Significant additional rules apply.

==== Taxation of nonresident aliens ====
Nonresident aliens are subject to regular income tax on income from a U.S. business or for services performed in the United States. Nonresident aliens are subject to a flat rate of U.S. income tax on certain enumerated types of U.S. source income, generally collected as a withholding tax. The rate of tax is 30% of the gross income, unless reduced by a tax treaty. Nonresident aliens are subject to U.S. federal income tax on some, but not all capital gains. Wages may be treated as effectively connected income, or may be subject to the flat 30% tax, depending on the facts and circumstances.

== Personal finance ==
In personal finance, gross income is the standard baseline for assessing a borrower's repayment capacity. Lenders compute the debt-to-income ratio by dividing total monthly debt payments by gross monthly income, and U.S. mortgage-affordability guidance from the Consumer Financial Protection Bureau is commonly framed in those terms.

== See also ==
- Adjusted gross income
- Effective gross income
- Fiscal illusion
- Gross margin
- Net income
- Amount realized
- Cost of goods sold (COGS)
- Earnings before interest, taxes, depreciation and amortization (EBITDA)
- Profit margin (the ratio of net income to net sales)
- Selling, general and administrative expenses (SG&A)
- Income statement
