= Net realizable value =

Method of evaluating an asset's worth in inventory accounting

Net realizable value (NRV) is a measure of a fixed or current asset's worth when held in inventory, in the field of accounting. NRV is part of the Generally Accepted Accounting Principles (GAAP) and International Financial Reporting Standards (IFRS) that apply to valuing inventory, so as to not overstate or understate the value of inventory goods. Net realizable value is generally equal to the selling price of the inventory goods less the selling costs (completion and disposal). Therefore, it is expected sales price less selling costs (e.g. repair and disposal costs). NRV prevents overstating or understating of an assets value. NRV is the price cap when using the Lower of Cost or Market Rule.

Under IFRS, companies need to record the cost of their ending inventory at the lower of cost and NRV, to ensure that their inventory and income statement are not overstated (under ASPE, companies record the lower of cost and market value). For example, under IFRS, at a company's year end, if an unfinished good that already cost $25 is expected to sell for $100 to a customer, but it will take an additional $20 to complete and $10 to advertise to the customer, its NRV will be $\$100-\$20-\$10=\$70$. In this year's income statement, since the cost of the good ($25) is less than its NRV ($70), the cost of the good will get recorded as the cost of inventory. In next year's income statement after the good was sold, this company will record a revenue of $100, cost of goods sold of $25, and cost of completion and disposal of $\$20+\$10=\$30$. This leads to a profit of $\$100-\$25-\$30=\$45$ on this transaction.

IFRS	
Expected Selling Price	100
Initial Cost	25
Selling Expenses (completion expenses and advertising expenses)	30
NRV (Selling Price - Selling Expenses)	70
Profit (Selling Price - Initial Cost - Selling Expenses)	45

Suppose we changed the example so that it costs $60 to advertise to the customer. Now the good's NRV will be $\$100-\$20 -\$60=\$20$. In this year's income statement, since the NRV ($20) is less than the cost of the good ($25), the NRV will get recorded as the Cost of Ending Inventory. To do so, an inventory write down of $\$25-\$20=\$5$ is done, and hence a decrease of $5 in this year's income statement. In the next year's income statement after the good was sold, this company will record a revenue of $100, Cost of Goods Sold of $20, and Cost of Completion and Disposal of $\$20+\$60 = \$80$. This leads to the company breaking even on this transaction ($\$100-\$20-\$80=\$0$).

IFRS	
Expected Selling Price	100
Initial Cost	25
Selling Expenses (completion expenses and advertising expenses)	80
NRV (Selling Price − Selling Expenses)	20
Profit (Selling Price − Initial Cost − Selling Expenses)	0

Inventory can be valued at either its historical cost or its market value. Because the market value of an inventory is not always available, NRV is sometimes used as a substitute for this value.
