= Amount realized =

Amount realized, in US federal income tax law, is defined by section 1001(b) of Internal Revenue Code. It is one of two variables in the formula used to compute gains and losses to determine gross income for income tax purposes. The excess of the amount realized over the adjusted basis is the amount of realized gain (if positive) or realized loss (if negative).

Computation of gain and loss is governed by section 1001(a) of the Code.

== Statutory definition ==
Section 1001(b) defines the amount realized as "the sum of any money received plus the fair market value of the property (other than money) received." Generally, it is the value of what the taxpayer receives in the exchange.

== Calculating amount realized ==
To have an "amount realized" there must be a kind of exchange, known as a "realization event." The first step in calculating the amount realized is determining when an exchange that qualifies as a "realization event" has occurred. Section 1001 requires that it be an exchange through which the taxpayer receives money or other property. In Helvering v. Bruun, the United States Supreme Court has held that a "[g]ain may occur as a result of exchange of property, payment of the taxpayer's indebtedness, relief from a liability, or other profit realized from the completion of a transaction." More clearly, the Supreme Court lists four events that trigger realization of gain or loss: 1) a property exchange, 2) relief of a legal obligation owed to a third party, 3) relief of a legal obligation owed to the party receiving property, or 4) other profit transactions.

A good illustration for determining realization for income tax purposes is stock. For example, at the beginning of the taxable year, Sally buys stock in XYZ Corp. for $10 per share. By the end of the taxable year, Sally's stock in XYZ Corp. is worth $20 a share. Would Sally have to report the appreciation in her stock as taxable income? Because Sally has not sold her stock (or otherwise exchanged it), she has not realized the stock's appreciation. If Sally had sold the stock in XYZ Corp. at $20 per share, the sale would be a realization event, and Sally would recognize income (in this case, a gain). Realization would also occur if Sally exchanged her stock for a new car or for a certain amount of services.

In a transaction where property is exchanged for other property, no realization event occurs where this is no legal distinction between the exchanged properties. According to the Supreme Court in Cottage Savings,

[u]nder our interpretation of § 1001(a), an exchange of property gives rise to a realization event so long as the exchanged properties are "materially different: they embody legally distinct entitlements.

The facts in Cottage Savings present an example of realization occurring when property is exchanged for property. Cottage Savings Association (CSA) sold interest in home mortgages to four savings and loans associations. At the same time, CSA bought interest in mortgages held by the same four savings and loans associations. "The fair market value of the package of participation interests exchanged by each side was approximately $4.5 million." (Essentially, CSA and the four savings and loans associations exchanged $4.5 million worth of mortgage interests.) The Supreme Court held that a realization event under § 1001 had occurred:

[b]ecause the participation interests exchanged by Cottage Savings and the other [savings and loans associations] derived from loans that were made to different obligors and secured by different homes, the exchanged interests did embody legally distinct entitlements. Consequently, we conclude that Cottage Savings realized its losses at the point of the exchange.

== Impact ==
To suggest that Congress could tax unrealized gain is not to suggest Congress intends to do so. The realization requirement is a pervasive, popularly supported aspect of our tax system, and there is no indication Congress is about to reverse course in this regard.

According to Burke and Friel, there are policy arguments to be made for and against taxing appreciation. If Congress chose to tax appreciation, taxpayers' tax income would likely match their economic income: "it would thus tend to place on the same tax footing persons who are economically similarly situated." However, the current system allows the IRS a degree of "administrative convenience." Moreover, it is arguably unfair to treat unrealized gains as income if the taxpayer may not have the appropriate funds to cover the tax liability, presumably forcing the taxpayer to sell the asset in question simply to pay the tax resulting from it. In the end, economic gain will be taxed. "Realization is fundamentally a matter of timing.... [t]he unrealized total gain, of course, may fluctuate from time to time as the property's value changes, but that total will be treated as income only on realization. To describe realization as a matter of timing should, nonetheless, not be seen as a dismissive comment. In taxes, as in life, timing can be everything...."

== See also ==
- Gross income
- Realization
