= Lower of cost or market =

Method of valuing inventory in accounting

In accounting, lower of cost or market (LCM or LOCOM) is a conservative approach to valuing and reporting inventory. Normally, ending inventory is stated at historical cost. However, there are times when the original cost of the ending inventory is greater than the net realizable value, and thus the inventory has lost value. If the inventory has decreased in value below historical cost, then its carrying value is reduced and reported on the balance sheet. The criterion for reporting this is the current market value. Any loss resulting from the decline in the value of inventory is charged to "cost of goods sold" (COGS) if non-material, or "loss on the reduction of inventory to LCM" if material.

== History ==
The lower of cost or market concept first became part of normal accounting practices in England during the nineteenth century. Lower of cost or market was considered fair because assets were valued on a going-concern basis, rather than the price at which the assets were purchased. During the nineteenth century, lower of cost or market was not common practice for valuation of factory inventory in the United States. The concept was not easy for the Academic Accountants to accept due to its lack of logic. Despite the criticism, lower of cost or market quickly caught on in practice and by the early twentieth century was described as the most commonly accepted method for inventory valuation according to the Report of the Special Committee on Co-operation with Stock Exchanges. Although it lacked accounting logic, lower of cost or market survived because of its conservative approach to valuation and because it addressed opposing principles of cost and value. Its conservatism allowed users to value the inventory at the price for which the inventory could be sold.

== Challenges ==
Three possible values can represent the market value: the replacement cost of the inventory, the net realizable value (also known as the "ceiling"), and the "floor" (the difference between the net realizable value and the normal profit). In the lower of cost or market approach, companies must determine these three values and find the median of the values. The companies then compare the median value, which is called the designated market value, to the inventory cost that is recorded. The lower of these two values is subsequently reported on the balance sheet. Because the lower of cost or market approach requires companies to use three possible market values, the companies' financial statements can be difficult to compare.

== Contemporary usage ==
The term "lower of cost or market" is now obsolete and is officially replaced by "lower of cost and net realizable value". According to the FASB Accounting Standards Update,

An entity should measure inventory within the scope of this Update at the lower of cost and net realizable value. Net realizable value is the estimated selling prices in the ordinary course of business, less reasonably predictable costs of completion, disposal, and transportation.

This FASB update makes usage consistent with the IFRS wording and removes the use of "or" in a context where "and" was always the correct one. However, the update does not apply to all companies. Companies that use the FIFO (first-in, first-out) and average-cost methods of inventory valuation are required to implement the changes, whereas companies that use the LIFO (last-in, first-out) and retail inventory methods are not affected by the update.

== See also ==
- Inventory valuation
- Impaired asset
- Fair market value
- Value (economics)
