= Performance fee =

Fee for managing an investment

A performance fee is a fee that a client account or an investment fund may be charged by the investment manager that manages its assets in addition to its management fee.

A performance fee may be calculated many ways. With respect to a separate account, it is often based on the change in net realized and unrealized gains, although in some cases, it can be based on other measures, such as net income generated. While not very common, some fund managers have attempted to link the performance fee to both upward and downward movement in a fund's gains, such as the shock absorber fee, where the fund manager gets penalised (before the investor) for adverse movement in the fund value. With respect to hedge funds and other investment funds, it is generally calculated by reference to the increase in the clientfund's net asset value (or "NAV"), which represents the value of the fund's investments. Performance fees are widely used by the investment managers of hedge funds, which typically charge a performance fee of 20% of the increase in the NAV of the fund in addition to the base management fee.

In the United States, performance fees charged by registered investment advisers are subject to certain requirements under the Investment Advisers Act of 1940. In addition, performance fees may be charged to registered investment companies only under certain conditions. Finally, performance fees charged to pension plans governed by the Employee Retirement Income Security Act (ERISA) must also meet certain requirements.

== Worked example ==
An example might be as follows: An investor subscribes for shares worth $1,000,000 in a hedge fund. Over the next year the value of the fund is increased by 10% (before accounting for the performance fee, but after deduction of all other fees), so that the value of the investor's shares on that basis (called the "gross asset value") is $1,100,000. Of the $100,000 increase, 20% (i.e. $20,000) will be paid to the investment manager as performance fee, leaving a net asset value of the investor's shares of $1,080,000, and giving a net return of 8%.

== High water marks ==
The highest NAV of a fund to date is known as the "high-water mark". If the NAV of a fund declines during a year, no performance fee will be payable to the investment manager as there is no gain. If the NAV subsequently increases over the following year back to the high-water mark (but no higher), it would be objectionable for the investor to be charged a performance fee on that increase because the investor has not yet made an overall return on its investment. Therefore hedge funds typically only charge a performance fee on increases in NAV over the high-water mark.

== Hurdles ==
A hurdle, in the context of a performance fee, is a level of return that the fund must beat before it can charge a performance fee. It may be a set percentage or it may be referenced to an index. The index might be either SOFR or similar or an index reflecting the underlying market in which the fund is investing. The thinking behind the former is to reflect the cost of capital. The thinking behind the latter is to reward the fund only for generating returns that are better than the market (alpha) rather than for returns generated simply by movement in the market as a whole.

If, in the worked example above, there had been a hurdle of 4%, the performance fee would only have been charged on the additional 6% increase rather than the full 10% increase in gross asset value.

As hurdles reduce the size of performance fees and reward successful active management, they are popular with investors. However, as demand for hedge funds has been high in recent years, fewer hedge funds have needed to resort to their use to attract investors.

== Other fees ==
As well as a performance fee, a hedge fund will charge a management fee, typically calculated as 1.50% to 2% of the NAV of the fund, regardless of whether the fund has generated any returns for the investor. Hedge funds may also pay fees to administrators, prime brokers, lawyers, accountants and other service providers.

A similar fee structure is also used in private equity and some venture capital funds, where the performance-based component is commonly structured as carried interest allocated to the general partner from fund profits.

== See also ==
- Carried interest
- Management fee
