= Convention of conservatism =

Accounting practice of anticipating future losses but not future gains

In accounting, the convention of conservatism, also known as the doctrine of prudence, is a policy of anticipating possible future losses but not future gains. It states that when choosing between two solutions, the one that will be least likely to overstate assets and income should be selected. This policy tends to understate net assets and net income, and therefore lead companies to "play safe". When given a choice between several outcomes where the probabilities of occurrence are equally likely, one should recognize that transaction resulting in the lower amount of profit, or at least the deferral of a profit.

Conservatism plays an important role in a number of accounting rules, including the allowance for doubtful debts and the lower of cost or market rule, which states that one should record inventory at the lower of either its acquisition cost or its current market value.

== See also ==
- Generally Accepted Accounting Principles (GAAP)
- U.S. GAAP
- International Financial Reporting Standards (IFRS)
- Conservatism concept
- Prudence concept
