= Cost of goods sold =

Carrying value of goods sold during a particular period

Cost of goods sold (COGS) (also cost of products sold (COPS), or cost of sales) is the carrying value of goods sold during a particular period.

Costs are associated with particular goods using one of several formulas, including specific identification, first-in first-out (FIFO), or average cost. Costs include all costs of purchase, costs of conversion and other costs that are incurred in bringing the inventories to their present location and condition. Costs of goods made by the businesses include material, labor, and allocated overhead. The costs of those goods which are not yet sold are deferred as costs of inventory until the inventory is sold or written down in value.

== Overview ==
Many businesses sell goods that they have bought or produced. When the goods are bought or produced, the costs associated with such goods are capitalized as part of inventory (or stock) of goods. These costs are treated as an expense in the period the business recognizes income from sale of the goods.

Determining costs requires keeping records of goods or materials purchased and any discounts on such purchase. In addition, if the goods are modified, the business must determine the costs incurred in modifying the goods. Such modification costs include labor, supplies or additional material, supervision, quality control, and use of equipment. Principles for determining costs may be easily stated, but application in practice is often difficult due to a variety of considerations in the allocation of costs.

Cost of goods sold may also reflect adjustments. Among the potential adjustments are decline in value of the goods (i.e., lower market value than cost), obsolescence, damage, etc.

When multiple goods are bought or made, it may be necessary to identify which costs relate to which particular goods sold. This may be done using an identification convention, such as specific identification of the goods, first-in-first-out (FIFO), or average cost. Alternative systems may be used in some countries, such as last-in-first-out (LIFO), gross profit method, retail method, or a combinations of these.

Cost of goods sold may be the same or different for accounting and tax purposes, depending on the rules of the particular jurisdiction. Certain expenses are included in COGS. Expenses that are included in COGS cannot be deducted again as a business expense. COGS expenses include:

- The cost of products or raw materials, including freight or shipping charges;
- The direct labor costs of workers who produce the products;
- The cost of storing products the business sells;
- Factory overhead expenses.

== Importance of inventories ==
Inventories have a significant effect on profits. A business that produces or buys goods to sell must keep track of inventories of goods under all accounting and income tax rules. An example illustrates why. Fred buys auto parts and resells them. In 2008, Fred buys $100 worth of parts. He sells parts for $80 that he bought for $30, and has $70 worth of parts left. In 2009, he sells the remainder of the parts for $180. If he keeps track of inventory, his profit in 2008 is $50, and his profit in 2009 is $110, or $160 in total. If he deducted all the costs in 2008, he would have a loss of $20 in 2008 and a profit of $180 in 2009. The total is the same, but the timing is much different. Most countries' accounting and income tax rules (if the country has an income tax) require the use of inventories for all businesses that regularly sell goods they have made or bought.

== Cost of goods for resale ==
Cost of goods purchased for resale includes purchase price as well as all other costs of acquisitions, excluding any discounts.

Additional costs may include freight paid to acquire the goods, customs duties, sales or use taxes not recoverable paid on materials used, and fees paid for acquisition. For financial reporting purposes such period costs as purchasing department, warehouse, and other operating expenses are usually not treated as part of inventory or cost of goods sold. For U.S. income tax purposes, some of these period costs must be capitalized as part of inventory. Costs of selling, packing, and shipping goods to customers are treated as operating expenses related to the sale. Both International and U.S. accounting standards require that certain abnormal costs, such as those associated with idle capacity, must be treated as expenses rather than part of inventory.

Discounts that must be deducted from the costs of purchased inventory are the following:

- Trade discounts (reduction in the price of goods that a manufacturer or wholesaler provides to a retailer) – includes a discount that is always allowed, regardless of the time of payment.
- Manufacturer's rebates – based on the dealer's purchases during the year.
- Cash discounts (a reduction in the invoice price that the seller provides if the dealer pays immediately or within a specified time) – may reduce COGS, or may be treated separately as gross income.

Value added tax is generally not treated as part of cost of goods sold if it may be used as an input credit or is otherwise recoverable from the taxing authority.

== Cost of goods made by the business ==
The cost of goods produced in the business should include all costs of production. The key components of cost generally include:

- Parts, raw materials and supplies used,
- Labor, including associated costs such as payroll taxes and benefits, and
- Overhead of the business allocated to production.

Most businesses make more than one of a particular item. Thus, costs are incurred for multiple items rather than a particular item sold. Determining how much of each of these components to allocate to particular goods requires either tracking the particular costs or making some allocations of costs. Parts and raw materials are often tracked to particular sets (e.g., batches or production runs) of goods, then allocated to each item.

Labor costs include direct labor and indirect labor. Direct labor costs are the wages paid to those employees who spend all their time working directly on the product being manufactured. Indirect labor costs are the wages paid to other factory employees involved in production. Costs of payroll taxes and fringe benefits are generally included in labor costs, but may be treated as overhead costs. Labor costs may be allocated to an item or set of items based on timekeeping records.

Costs of materials include direct raw materials, as well as supplies and indirect materials. Where non-incidental amounts of supplies are maintained, the taxpayer must keep inventories of the supplies for income tax purposes, charging them to expense or cost of goods sold as used rather than as purchased.

Materials and labor may be allocated based on past experience, or standard costs. Where materials or labor costs for a period fall short of or exceed the expected amount of standard costs, a variance is recorded. Such variances are then allocated among cost of goods sold and remaining inventory at the end of the period.

Determining overhead costs often involves making assumptions about what costs should be associated with production activities and what costs should be associated with other activities. Traditional cost accounting methods attempt to make these assumptions based on past experience and management judgment as to factual relationships. Activity based costing attempts to allocate costs based on those factors that drive the business to incur the costs.

Overhead costs are often allocated to sets of produced goods based on the ratio of labor hours or costs or the ratio of materials used for producing the set of goods. Overhead costs may be referred to as factory overhead or factory burden for those costs incurred at the plant level or overall burden for those costs incurred at the organization level. Where labor hours are used, a burden rate or overhead cost per hour of labor may be added along with labor costs. Other methods may be used to associate overhead costs with particular goods produced. Overhead rates may be standard rates, in which case there may be variances, or may be adjusted for each set of goods produced.

== Identification conventions ==
In some cases, the cost of goods sold may be identified with the item sold. Ordinarily, however, the identity of goods is lost between the time of purchase or manufacture and the time of sale. Determining which goods have been sold, and the cost of those goods, requires either identifying the goods or using a convention to assume which goods were sold. This may be referred to as a cost flow assumption or inventory identification assumption or convention. The following methods are available in many jurisdictions for associating costs with goods sold and goods still on hand:

- Specific identification. Under this method, particular items are identified, and costs are tracked with respect to each item. This may require considerable recordkeeping. This method cannot be used where the goods or items are indistinguishable or fungible.
- Average cost. The average cost method relies on average unit cost to calculate cost of units sold and ending inventory. Several variations on the calculation may be used, including weighted average and moving average.
- First-In First-Out (FIFO) assumes that the items purchased or produced first are sold first. Costs of inventory per unit or item are determined at the time produces or purchased. The oldest cost (i.e., the first in) is then matched against revenue and assigned to cost of goods sold.
- Last-In First-Out (LIFO) is the reverse of FIFO. Some systems permit determining the costs of goods at the time acquired or made, but assigning costs to goods sold under the assumption that the goods made or acquired last are sold first. Costs of specific goods acquired or made are added to a pool of costs for the type of goods. Under this system, the business may maintain costs under FIFO but track an offset in the form of a LIFO reserve. Such reserve (an asset or contra-asset) represents the difference in cost of inventory under the FIFO and LIFO assumptions. Such amount may be different for financial reporting and tax purposes in the United States.
- Dollar Value LIFO. Under this variation of LIFO, increases or decreases in the LIFO reserve are determined based on dollar values rather than quantities.
- Retail inventory method. Resellers of goods may use this method to simplify record keeping. The calculated cost of goods on hand at the end of a period is the ratio of cost of goods acquired to the retail value of the goods times the retail value of goods on hand. Cost of goods acquired includes beginning inventory as previously valued plus purchases. Cost of goods sold is then beginning inventory plus purchases less the calculated cost of goods on hand at the end of the period.

== Example ==
Jane owns a business that resells machines. At the start of 2009, she has no machines or parts on hand. She buys machines A and B for 10 each, and later buys machines C and D for 12 each. All the machines are the same, but they have serial numbers. Jane sells machines A and C for 20 each. Her cost of goods sold depends on her inventory method. Under specific identification, the cost of goods sold is 10 + 12, the particular costs of machines A and C. If she uses FIFO, her costs are 20 (10+10). If she uses average cost, her costs are 22 ( (10+10+12+12)/4 x 2). If she uses LIFO, her costs are 24 (12+12). Thus, her profit for accounting and tax purposes may be 20, 18, or 16, depending on her inventory method. After the sales, her inventory values are either 20, 22 or 24.

After year end, Jane decides she can make more money by improving machines B and D. She buys and uses 10 of parts and supplies, and it takes 6 hours at 2 per hour to make the improvements to each machine. Jane has overhead, including rent and electricity. She calculates that the overhead adds 0.5 per hour to her costs. Thus, Jane has spent 20 to improve each machine (10/2 + 12 + (6 x 0.5) ). She sells machine D for 45. Her cost for that machine depends on her inventory method. If she used FIFO, the cost of machine D is 12 plus 20 she spent improving it, for a profit of 13. Remember, she used up the two 10 cost items already under FIFO. If she uses average cost, it is 11 plus 20, for a profit of 14. If she used LIFO, the cost would be 10 plus 20 for a profit of 15.

In year 3, Jane sells the last machine for 38 and quits the business. She recovers the last of her costs. Her total profits for the three years are the same under all inventory methods. Only the timing of income and the balance of inventory differ. Here is a comparison under FIFO, Average Cost, and LIFO:

		Cost of Goods Sold			Profit		
Year	Sales	FIFO	Avg.	LIFO	FIFO	Avg.	LIFO
1	40	20	22	24	20	18	16
2	45	32	31	30	13	14	15
3	38	32	31	30	6	7	8
Total	123	84	84	84	39	39	39

== Write-downs and allowances ==
The value of goods held for sale by a business may decline due to a number of factors. The goods may prove to be defective or below normal quality standards (subnormal). The goods may become obsolete. The market value of the goods may simply decline due to economic factors.

Where the market value of goods has declined for whatever reasons, the business may choose to value its inventory at the lower of cost or market value, also known as net realizable value. This may be recorded by accruing an expense (i.e., creating an inventory reserve) for declines due to obsolescence, etc. Current period net income as well as net inventory value at the end of the period is reduced for the decline in value.

Any property held by a business may decline in value or be damaged by unusual events, such as a fire. The loss of value where the goods are destroyed is accounted for as a loss, and the inventory is fully written off. Generally, such loss is recognized for both financial reporting and tax purposes. However, book and tax amounts may differ under some systems.

== Alternative views ==
Alternatives to traditional cost accounting have been proposed by various management theorists. These include:

- Throughput accounting, under the theory of constraints, under which only totally variable costs are included in cost of goods sold and inventory is treated as investment.
- Lean accounting, in which most traditional costing methods are ignored in favor of measuring weekly "value streams".
- Resource consumption accounting, which discards most current accounting concepts in favor of proportional costing based on simulations.

None of these views conform to U.S. Generally Accepted Accounting Principles or International Accounting Standards, nor are any accepted for most income or other tax reporting purposes.

== Other terms ==
Net sales = gross sales – (customer discounts, returns, and allowances)
Gross profit = net sales – cost of goods sold
Operating profit = gross profit – total operating expenses
Net profit = operating profit – taxes – interest
Net profit = net sales – cost of goods sold – operating expense – taxes – interest

== See also ==
- Accounting standards
- Average cost method
- Cost of revenue
- Gross margin
- Income tax in the US
- Inventory
- List of business and finance abbreviations
