= Adjusted basis =

In tax accounting, adjusted basis is the net cost of an asset after adjusting for various tax-related items.

Adjusted Basis or Adjusted Tax Basis refers to the original cost or other basis of property, reduced by depreciation deductions and increased by capital expenditures.

Example: Michael buys a lot for $100,000. He then erects a retail facility for $600,000, then depreciates the improvements for tax purposes at the rate of $15,000 per year. After three years his adjusted tax basis is $655,000 = $100,000 + $600,000 - (3 x $15,000).

Adjusted basis is one of two variables in the formula used to compute gains and losses when determining gross income for tax purposes. The Amount Realized – Adjusted Basis tells the amount of Realized Gain (if positive) or Realized Loss (if negative).

== Statutory definition ==
Section 1012 of the Internal Revenue Code defines “basis” as a taxpayer's cost in acquiring property, except as provided in Sections 1001–1092. There is also an exception or "Special rule" under section 1012 (b) for "apportioned real estate taxes."

Section 1016 then lists 27 adjustments to this basis. Generally, improvements to property increase basis while depreciation deductions decrease it.

== Calculation ==
Adjusted basis is calculated by beginning with an asset's original cost basis, and then making adjustments. Adjusted basis is calculated as follows:

- Purchase costs (title & escrow fees, broker commissions, shipping, sales tax, etc.)
- Improvements (rehabilitation expenses & substantial repairs)
- Legal fees (to defend or to perfect title to the property, zoning costs, etc.)
- Selling costs (title & escrow fees, broker commissions, shipping, transfer fees, etc.)

Minus the costs represented by:

- Accumulated depreciation, depletion, or amortization
- Casualty or theft Loss
- Other decreases to basis

=== Adjusted basis ===
Adjusted basis is crucial for calculating capital gains and ordinary gains when an asset is sold.

A complete list of adjustments which increase or decrease basis is found in IRS Publication 551, Basis of Assets.
