= Throughput (business) =

In business, the rate of movement of inputs and outputs through a production process

Throughput in business is the rate at which a product is moved through a production process and onward to being consumed by an end-user, usually measured in the form of sales or usage statistics. The goal of most organizations is to minimize the investment in inputs as well as operating expenses while increasing throughput of its production systems. Successful organizations which seek to gain market share strive to match throughput to the rate of market demand of its products. The measurement of throughput is central to the concept of throughput accounting.

== Overview ==
In the business management theory of constraints, throughput is the rate at which a system achieves its goal. Oftentimes, this is monetary revenue and is in contrast to output, which is inventory that may be sold or stored in a warehouse. In this case, throughput is measured by revenue received (or not) at the point of sale—exactly the right time. Output that becomes part of the inventory in a warehouse may mislead investors or others about the organizations condition by inflating the apparent value of its assets. The theory of constraints and the practice of throughput accounting explicitly avoid that trap.

Throughput can be best described as the rate at which a system generates its products or services per unit of time. Businesses often measure their throughput using a mathematical equation known as Little's law, which is related to inventories and process time: time to fully process a single product.

== Basic formula ==
Using Little's Law, one can calculate throughput with the equation:

$I=R*T$

where:

- I is the number of units contained within the system, inventory;
- T is the time it takes for all the inventory to go through the process, flow time;
- R is the rate at which the process is delivering throughput, flow rate or throughput.

If you solve for R, you will get:
$R=I/T$.
