= Stock-taking =

Physical verification of stored items

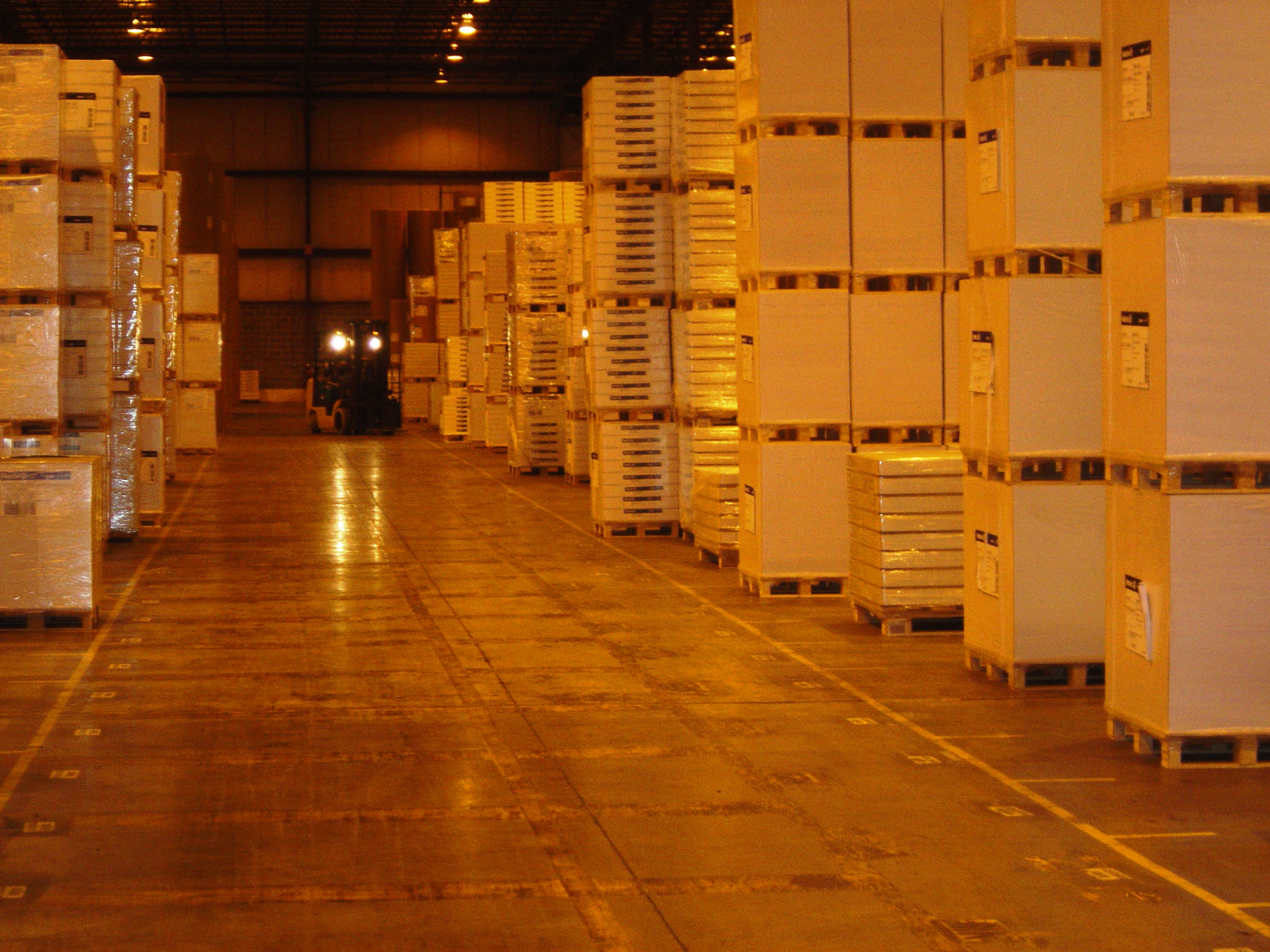
A warehouse filled with stock

Stock-taking, "inventory checking", or "wall-to-wall" is the physical verification of the quantities and condition of items held in an inventory or warehouse. This may be done to provide an audit of existing stock. It is also the source of stock discrepancy information. While they are often used interchangeably, stock and inventory are two different things. Stock is the products sold by a business. Inventory includes all items required to make, store or sell your stock.

Stock-taking may be performed as an intensive annual, end of fiscal year, procedure or may be done continuously by means of a cycle count. An annual end of fiscal year stock-taking is typically undertaken for use in a company's financial statements. It is often done in the presence of the external auditors who are auditing the financial statements.

Periodic counting is usually undertaken for regular, inexpensive items. The term "periodic" may refer to annual stock count. However, "periodic" may also refer to half yearly, seasonal, quarterly, monthly, bi-monthly or daily. For expensive items a shorter period of stock-taking is preferred.

A stock-take sale is a sale with reduced prices in a shop designed to sell off stock from previous seasons. This makes the task of stock-taking easier.

Another purpose of stock take is determination of a cutoff point i.e. what was the stock position of the company/organization at a specific point of time.

However, such stock-taking tasks are often laborious and often lead to significant warehouse operational downtime, ranging from days to weeks.

== Physical inventory ==
Physical inventory is a process where a business physically counts its entire inventory. A physical inventory may be mandated by financial accounting rules or the tax regulations to place an accurate value on the inventory, or the business may need to count inventory so component parts or raw materials can be restocked. Businesses may use several different tactics to minimize the disruption caused by physical inventory.

- Inventory services provide labor and automation to quickly count inventory and minimize shutdown time.
- Inventory control system software can speed the physical inventory process.
- A perpetual inventory system tracks the receipt and use of inventory, and calculates the quantity on hand.
- Cycle counting, an alternative to physical inventory, may be less disruptive.

The Finance or Business Manager of the unit is responsible for ensuring the annual physical inventory is properly performed, inventory records reflect actual quantities on hand, inventory valuation methods are appropriate, and adjustments are entered in the business's accounting system on a timely basis. In addition, the Finance or Business Manager is responsible for ensuring that segregation of duties is maintained throughout the inventory process to promote the safeguarding of the assets, protection of employees, and objective reporting of inventory. Specifically, no one person should be able to authorize a transaction (e.g., a purchase or sale), record the transaction, have custody of the inventory, and perform the related reconciliation.

== See also ==
- Logistics – Management of the flow of resources
- Inventory control system – Ensuring the correct level of stock
- Inventory management software – Software used to track inventory levels and stock movement
