= Throughput accounting =

Principle of management accounting

The throughput accounting (TA) is a principle-based and simplified management accounting approach that provides managers with decision support information for enterprise profitability improvement. This approach identifies the factors which limit an organization's ability to reach its goals, and then focuses on simple measures that drive behavior in key areas aimed at reaching those goals.

TA was proposed by Eliyahu M. Goldratt as an alternative to traditional cost accounting. It differs from costing, in it is cash focused and does not allocate all costs (variable and fixed expenses, including overheads) to products and services sold or provided by an enterprise, and it does not replace the need to prepare formal company accounts, although promoters of TA note that management decisions are not generally based on formal company accounts anyway.

Only costs that vary totally with units of output (see the definition of TVC below) e.g. raw materials, are allocated to products and services. These costs are deducted from sales to determine Throughput. Throughput Accounting is a management accounting technique used as the performance measure in the theory of constraints (TOC). It is the business intelligence used for maximizing profits, however, unlike cost accounting that primarily focuses on 'cutting costs' and reducing expenses to make a profit, Throughput Accounting primarily focuses on generating more throughput. Conceptually, Throughput Accounting seeks to increase the speed or rate at which throughput (see definition of T below) is generated by products and services with respect to an organization's constraint, whether the constraint is internal or external to the organization. Throughput Accounting is the only management accounting methodology that considers constraints as factors limiting the performance of organizations.

Management accounting is an organization's internal set of techniques and methods used to maximize shareholder wealth. Throughput Accounting is thus part of the management accountants' toolkit, ensuring efficiency where it matters as well as the overall effectiveness of the organization. It is an internal reporting tool. Outside or external parties to a business depend on accounting reports prepared by financial (public) accountants who apply Generally Accepted Accounting Principles (GAAP) issued by the Financial Accounting Standards Board (FASB) and enforced by the U.S. Securities and Exchange Commission (SEC) and other local and international regulatory agencies and bodies such as International Financial Reporting Standards (IFRS).

Throughput Accounting improves profit performance with better management decisions by using measurements that more closely reflect the effect of decisions on three critical monetary variables (throughput, investment (AKA inventory), and operating expense — defined below).

== History ==
When cost accounting was developed in the 1890s, labor was the largest fraction of product cost and could be considered a variable cost. Workers often did not know how many hours they would work in a week when they reported on Monday morning because time-keeping systems were rudimentary. Cost accountants, therefore, concentrated on how efficiently managers used labor since it was their most important variable resource. Now however, workers who come to work on Monday morning almost always work 40 hours or more; their cost is fixed rather than variable. However, today, many managers are still evaluated on their labor efficiencies, and many "downsizing", "rightsizing", and other labor reduction campaigns are based on them.

TA is a more recent development than cost accounting: Corbett's Throughout Accounting, for example, was published in 1999.

== The concepts of Throughput Accounting ==
Goldratt argues that, under current conditions, labor efficiencies lead to decisions that harm rather than help organizations. Throughput Accounting, therefore, removes standard cost accounting's reliance on efficiencies in general, and labor efficiency in particular, from management practice. Many cost and financial accountants agree with Goldratt's critique, but they have not agreed on a replacement of their own and there is enormous inertia in the installed base of people trained to work with existing practices.

Constraints accounting, which is a development in the Throughput Accounting field, emphasizes the role of the constraint, (referred to as the Archemedian constraint) in decision making.

Goldratt's alternative begins with the idea that each organization has a goal and that better decisions increase its value. The goal for a profit maximizing firm is stated as increasing net profit now and in the future. Profit maximization seen from a Throughput Accounting viewpoint, is about maximizing a system's profit mix without Cost Accounting's traditional allocation of total costs. Throughput Accounting actions include obtaining the maximum net profit in the minimum time period, given limited resource capacities and capabilities. These resources include machines, capital (own or borrowed), people, processes, technology, time, materials, markets, etc. Throughput Accounting applies to not-for-profit organizations too, where they develop their goal that makes sense in their individual cases, and these goals are commonly measured in goal units.

Throughput Accounting also pays particular attention to the concept of 'bottleneck' (referred to as constraint in the theory of constraints) in the manufacturing or servicing processes.

Throughput Accounting uses three measures of income and expense:

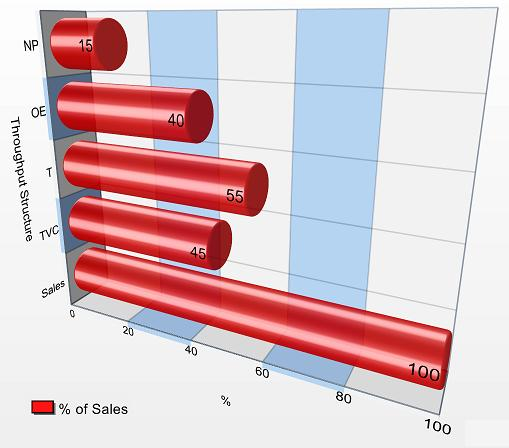
The chart illustrates a typical throughput structure of income (sales) and expenses (TVC and OE). T=Sales less TVC and NP=T less OE.

- Throughput (T) is the rate at which the system produces "goal units". When the goal units are money (in for-profit businesses), throughput is net sales (S) less totally variable cost (TVC), generally the cost of the raw materials (T = S – TVC). Note that T only exists when there is a sale of the product or service. Producing materials that sit in a warehouse does not form part of throughput but rather investment. ("Throughput" is sometimes referred to as "throughput contribution" and has similarities to the concept of "contribution" in marginal costing which is sales revenues less "variable" costs – "variable" being defined according to the marginal costing philosophy.)
- Investment (I) is the money tied up in the system. This is money associated with inventory, machinery, buildings, and other assets and liabilities. In earlier theory of constraints (TOC) documentation, the "I" was interchanged between "inventory" and "investment." The preferred term is now only "investment." Note that TOC recommends inventory be valued strictly on totally variable cost (TVC) associated with creating the inventory, not with additional cost allocations from overhead.
- Operating expense (OE) is the money the system spends in generating "goal units." For physical products, OE is all expenses except the cost of the raw materials. OE includes maintenance, utilities, rent, taxes and payroll.

Organizations that wish to increase their attainment of their goal should therefore require managers to test proposed decisions against three questions. Will the proposed change:

1. Increase throughput? How?
2. Reduce investment (inventory) (money that cannot be used)? How?
3. Reduce operating expense? How?

The answers to these questions determine the effect of proposed changes on system wide measurements:

1. Net profit (NP) = throughput – operating expense = T – OE
2. Return on investment (ROI) = net profit / investment = NP/I
3. TA Productivity = throughput / operating expense = T/OE
4. Investment turns (IT) = throughput / investment = T/I

These relationships between financial ratios as illustrated by Goldratt are very similar to a set of relationships defined by DuPont and General Motors financial executive Donaldson Brown about 1920. Brown did not advocate changes in management accounting methods, but instead used the ratios to evaluate traditional financial accounting data.

== Explanation ==
$\text{Throughput} = \text{Sales revenue – Total Variable Costs}$

$\text{Throughput accounting Ratio} = \text{Return per factory hour} / \text{Cost per factory hour}$

For example: The railway coach company was offered a contract to make 15 open-topped streetcars each month, using a design that included ornate brass foundry work, but very little of the metalwork needed to produce a covered rail coach. The buyer offered to pay $280 per streetcar. The company had a firm order for 40 rail coaches each month for $350 per unit.

The cost accountant determined that the cost of operating the foundry vs. the metalwork shop each month was as follows:

Overhead Cost by Department	Total Cost ($)	Hours Available per month	Cost per hour ($)
Foundry	7,300.00	160	45.63
Metal shop	3,300.00	160	20.63
Total	10,600.00	320	33.13

The company was at full capacity making 40 rail coaches each month. And since the foundry was expensive to operate, and purchasing brass as a raw material for the streetcars was expensive, the accountant determined that the company would lose money on any streetcars it built. He showed an analysis of the estimated product costs based on standard cost accounting and recommended that the company decline to build any streetcars.

Standard Cost Accounting Analysis	Streetcars	Rail coach
Monthly Demand	15	40
Price	$280	$350
Foundry Time (hrs)	3.0	2.0
Metalwork Time (hrs)	1.5	4.0
Total Time	4.5	6.0
Foundry Cost	$136.88	$91.25
Metalwork Cost	$30.94	$82.50
Raw Material Cost	$120.00	$60.00
Total Cost	$287.81	$233.75
Profit per Unit	$ (7.81)	$116.25

However, the company's operations manager knew that recent investment in automated foundry equipment had created idle time for workers in that department. The constraint on production of the railcoaches was the metalwork shop. She made an analysis of profit and loss if the company took the contract using throughput accounting to determine the profitability of products by calculating "throughput" (revenue less variable cost) in the metal shop.

Throughput Cost Accounting Analysis	Decline Contract	Take Contract
Coaches Produced	40	34
Streetcars Produced	0	15
Foundry Hours	80	113
Metal shop Hours	160	159
Coach Revenue	$14,000	$11,900
Streetcar Revenue	$0	$4,200
Coach Raw Material Cost	$(2,400)	$(2,040)
Streetcar Raw Material Cost	$0	$(1,800)
Throughput Value	$11,600	$12,260
Overhead Expense	$(10,600)	$(10,600)
Profit	$1,000	$1,660

After the presentations from the company accountant and the operations manager, the president understood that the metal shop capacity was limiting the company's profitability. The company could make only 40 rail coaches per month. But by taking the contract for the streetcars, the company could make nearly all the railway coaches ordered, and also meet all the demand for streetcars. The result would increase throughput in the metal shop from $6.25 to $10.38 per hour of available time, and increase profitability by 66 percent.

== Relevance ==
One of the most important aspects of Throughput Accounting is the relevance of the information it produces. Throughput Accounting reports what currently happens in business functions such as operations, distribution and marketing. It does not rely solely on GAAP's financial accounting reports (that still need to be verified by external auditors) and is thus relevant to current decisions made by management that affect the business now and in the future. Throughput Accounting is used in Critical Chain Project Management (CCPM), Drum Buffer Rope (DBR)—in businesses that are internally constrained, in Simplified Drum Buffer Rope (S-DBR)—in businesses that are externally constrained (particularly where the lack of customer orders denotes a market constraint), as well as in strategy, planning and tactics, etc.

== See also ==
The Goal (novel)
