= Farm Structure Survey =

Farm Structure Survey L’enquête sur la structure des exploitations agricoles
- Genre: Agricultural Survey Structure
- Frequency: Decennial (Census of Agriculture); Varying (Individual Farm Structure Surveys)
- Most recent: 2016 (Farm Structure Survey)
- Area: European Union
- Website: ec.europa.eu/eurostat/statistics-explained/index.php/Glossary:Farm_structure_survey_(FSS)

The Farm Structure Surveys (French: L’enquête sur la structure des exploitations agricoles), also known as the Survey on the Structure of Agricultural Holdings, are the methodological basis for censuses of agricultural operations throughout the European Union. The survey itself is used as the basis of an decennial European Union-wide census of agriculture as well as for sample surveys conducted between these years.

== Overview ==
At present, the Farm Structure Surveys are legislated through Regulation 1166/2008 of the European Parliament. Regulation 1166/2008 legislates both the decennial census of agriculture as well as follow-up surveys in 2013 and 2016.

The focus on these standards is to provide “comparable data on agricultural activities, at the appropriate geographical level, and covering the whole Community” for the purposes of informing the Common Agricultural Policy within the European Union and agricultural policy within individual states.

The census of agriculture is not operated concurrently to censuses of population throughout the European Union.

== Methodology ==
While the individual methodology of the Farm Structure Survey varies country to country, the focus is on observing each individual “agricultural holding” and their characteristics, including land, livestock, and labour force characteristics as well as rural development measures.

This agricultural holding, “a technical-economic unit, under single management, engaged in agricultural production” is the base unit of observation in the Farm Structure Surveys. Before 2007 this was defined as one hectare of “utilized agricultural area,” but since has become flexible, allowing individual countries to exclude only the smallest agricultural holdings which contribute 2% or less to total Utilized agricultural area or farm livestock units. Beyond this, specific physical thresholds are also given for inclusion:

- Utilised agricultural area (arable land, kitchen gardens, permanent grassland, permanent crops): 5 hectares
- Permanent outdoor crops (fruit, berry, citrus and olive plantations, vineyards and nurseries): 1 hectare
- Other intensive production:
- Fresh vegetables, melons and strawberries, which are outdoors or under low (not accessible) protective cover: 0.5 hectares
- Tobacco: 0.5 hectares
- Hops: 0.5 hectares
- Cotton: 0.5 hectares
- Crops under glass or other (accessible) protective cover:
- Fresh vegetables, melons and strawberries: 0.1 hectares
- Flowers and ornamental plants (excluding nurseries): 0.1 hectares
- Bovine animals (all): 10 heads
- Pigs (all): 50 heads
- Breeding sows: 10 heads
- Sheep (all): 20 heads
- Goats (all): 20 heads
- Poultry (all): 1 000 heads

As the thresholds have changed varyingly from country to country, this complicates the direct comparability of findings between years and between countries, alongside to the varying agricultural identities and cultures which exist within the European Union.

Like other censuses of agriculture, the information observed through the Farm Structure Surveys are protected by confidentiality in both limiting local parameters and aggregation of the reported data.

=== Standard gross margin ===
Standard gross margins or SGMs enable the classification of farms according to the type of enterprises on the farm and their relative contribution to overall profitability. The SGM provides a measure of a holding's business size, irrespective of its area and intensity of production. SGMs are calculated per unit area of crops and head of livestock, using standardized SGM coefficients for each type of crop and livestock. Different SGM coefficients are calculated for different geographical regions to allow for differences in profit. SGMs are representative of the level of profit that could be expected on the average farm under "normal" conditions (i.e. no disease outbreaks or adverse weather).

Eurostat uses SGMs for collating European Union farm statistics. In the UK, the UK government's June census for agriculture also applies this classification. As the system of classifying business size was developed for use within the EU statistical network, SGMs are measured in euros and presented in size ranges, which relate to European size units (ESU). The resulting figures per hectare of crop and per head of livestock are then totaled for the whole farm. Sizes of holdings are defined, for example, in the UK, as:

| Size of holding | SGM (euro) | European Size Units |
|---|---|---|
| Very small | less than 9,600 | less than 8 |
| Small | 9,600 < 48,000 | 8 < 40 |
| Medium | 48,000 < 120,000 | 40 < 100 |
| Large | 120,000 < 240,000 | 100 < 200 |
| Very large | 240,000 + | 200 + |

== Publication ==
Like other agricultural surveys, the results of the Farm Structure Surveys are published for public use. As they are the aggregate of data collection by individual nations statistics agencies, the timeline for data to be shared with the European Commission is twelve to eighteen months after the survey year. This means that the data is shared later than other censuses of agriculture.

The most recent European Union Census of Agriculture data can be found in the 2013 Agriculture, forestry and fishery statistics produced by Eurostat.

== See also ==
- Common Agricultural Policy
- Agriculture and Fisheries Council
