= FIFO and LIFO accounting =

Methods used in managing inventory

FIFO and LIFO accounting are methods used in managing inventory and financial matters involving the amount of money a company has to have tied up within inventory of produced goods, raw materials, parts, components, or feedstocks. They are used to manage assumptions of costs related to inventory, stock repurchases (if purchased at different prices), and various other accounting purposes.

== FIFO ==
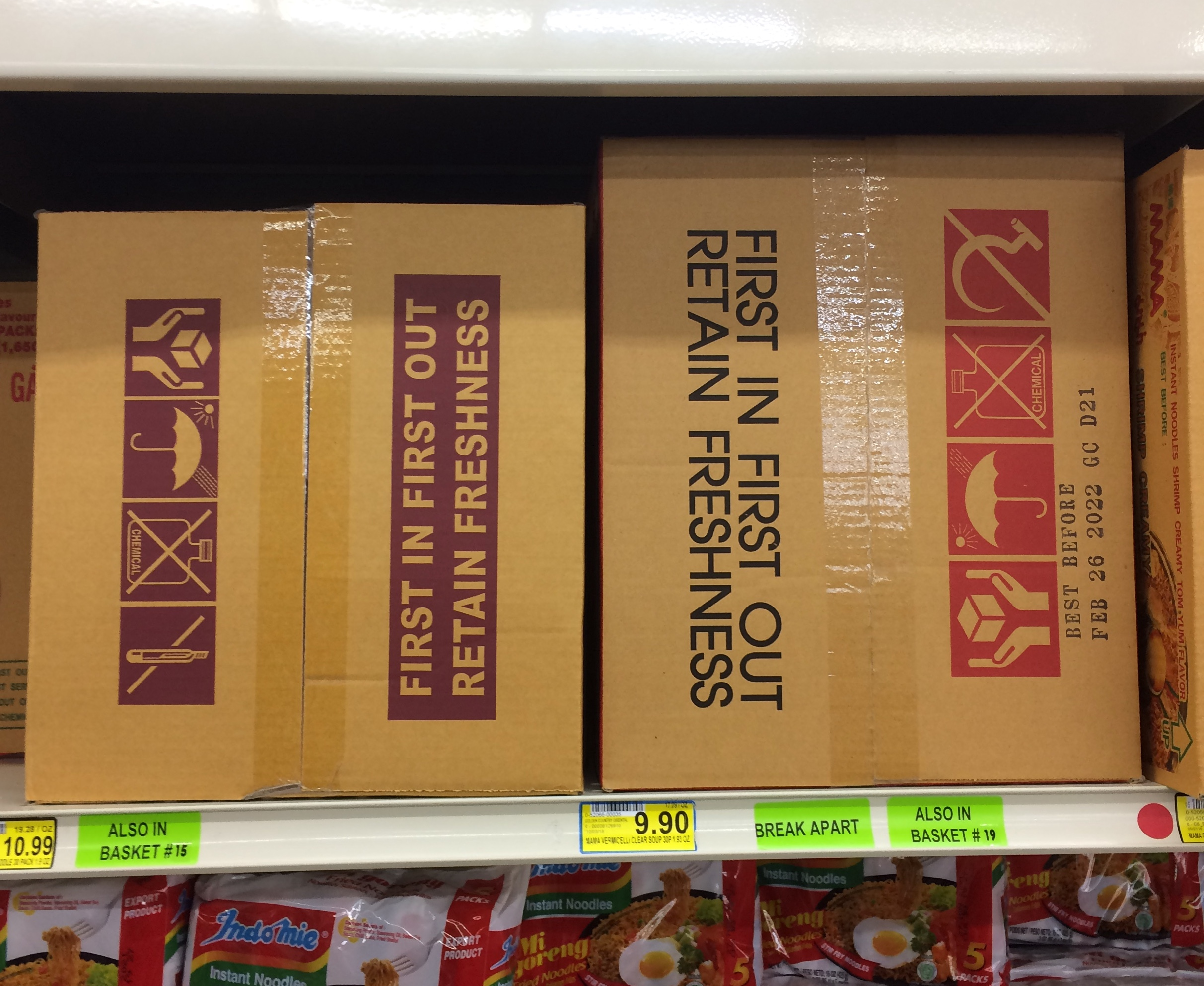
Boxes of instant noodles on a supermarket shelf, with the words "First In First Out / Retain Freshness" written on them

"FIFO" stands for first-in, first-out, meaning that the oldest inventory items are recorded as sold first (but this does not necessarily mean that the exact oldest physical object has been tracked and sold). In other words, the cost associated with the inventory that was purchased first is the cost expensed first.

A company might use the LIFO method for accounting purposes, even if it uses FIFO for inventory management purposes (i.e., for the actual storage, shelving, and sale of its merchandise). For example, a company that sells many perishable goods, such as a supermarket chain, is likely to follow the FIFO method when managing inventory, to ensure that goods with earlier expiration dates are sold before goods with later expiration dates. However, this does not preclude that same company from accounting for its merchandise with the LIFO method.

With FIFO, the cost of inventory reported on the balance sheet represents the cost of the inventory purchased earliest. FIFO most closely mimics the flow of inventory, as businesses are far more likely to sell the oldest inventory first.

Consider this example: Foo Co. had the following inventory at hand, in order of acquisition in November:

Number of units	Cost
100 units	$50
125 units	$55
75 units	$59

If Foo Co. sells 210 units during November, the company would expense the cost associated with the first 100 units at $50 and the remaining 110 units at $55. Under FIFO, the total cost of sales for November would be $11,050. The ending inventory would be calculated the following way:

Number of units	Price per unit	Total
Remaining 15 units	$55	$825 ($55 x 15 units)
75 units	$59	$4425 ($59 x 75 units)
Total		$5250

Thus, the balance sheet would now show the inventory valued at $5250.

=== FIFO Tax Implications ===
FIFO will have a higher ending inventory value and lower cost of goods sold (COGS) compared to LIFO in a period of rising prices. Therefore, under these circumstances, FIFO would produce a higher gross profit and, similarly, a higher income tax expense.

== LIFO ==
"LIFO" stands for last-in, first-out, meaning that the most recently purchased items are recorded as sold first. From the 1970s, some U.S. companies shifted towards the use of LIFO, which reduces their income taxes in times of inflation, but since International Financial Reporting Standards (IFRS) banned LIFO, more companies returned to FIFO. One third of American companies are thought to use LIFO, according to the "Save LIFO Coalition", which argues in favor of the retention of the LIFO method.

LIFO is used only in the United States, which is governed by the generally accepted accounting principles (GAAP). Section 472 of the Internal Revenue Code directs how LIFO may be used if necessary. The code directs that LIFO may be used "only if the taxpayer establishes" that they have no other way of valuing their inventory.

In the FIFO example above, the company (Foo Co.), using LIFO accounting, would expense the cost associated with the first 75 units at $59, 125 more units at $55, and the remaining 10 units at $50. Under LIFO, the total cost of sales for November would be $11,800. The ending inventory would be calculated the following way:

Number of units	Price per unit	Total
Remaining 90 units	$50	$4500 ($50 x 90 units)
Total		$4500

The balance sheet would show $4500 in inventory under LIFO.

The difference between the cost of an inventory calculated under the FIFO and LIFO methods is called the LIFO reserve (in the example above, it is $750, i.e. $5250 - $4500). This reserve, a form of contra account, is essentially the amount by which an entity's taxable income has been deferred by using the LIFO method.

In most sets of accounting standards, such as the International Financial Reporting Standards, FIFO (or LIFO) valuation principles are "in-fine" subordinated to the higher principle of lower of cost or market valuation.

In the United States, publicly traded entities which use LIFO for taxation purposes must also use LIFO for financial reporting purposes, but such companies are also likely to report a LIFO reserve to their shareholders. A number of tax reform proposals have argued for the repeal of LIFO tax provision.
