= Perpetual inventory =

In business and accounting/accountancy, perpetual inventory system or continuous inventory system describes systems of inventory where information on inventory quantity and availability is updated on a continuous/real-time basis as a function of doing business. Generally this is accomplished by connecting the inventory system with order entry and in retail the point of sale system. In this case, book inventory would be exactly the same as, or almost the same, as the real inventory.

In earlier periods, non-continuous, or periodic inventory systems were more prevalent. Starting in the 1970s digital computers made possible the ability to implement a perpetual inventory system. This has been facilitated by bar coding and lately radio frequency identification (RFID) labeling which allows computer systems to quickly read and process inventory information as part of transaction processing.

Perpetual inventory systems can still be vulnerable to errors due to overstatements (phantom inventory) or understatements (missing inventory) that can occur as a result of theft, breakage, scanning errors or untracked inventory movements, leading to systematic errors in replenishment.

The perpetual inventory formula is very straightforward.

Beginning Inventory (usually from a physical count) + receipts - shipments = Ending Inventory. Some accountants will add or subtract a value using an adjustment entry (journal voucher), however if all receipts (purchases) and shipments (invoices) are captured as transactions, this would never need to occur.
