= Management fee =

Periodic payment by an investment fund to its adviser

In the investment advisory industry, a management fee is a periodic payment that is paid by an investment fund to the fund's investment adviser for investment and portfolio management services. Often, the fee covers not only investment advisory services, but administrative services as well. Usually, the fee is calculated as a percentage of assets under management.

In manage property sector, is also used. Usually under management contract. Is used for running hotels, and restaurants.

== Mutual funds ==
In a mutual fund, the management fee will include any fees payable to the fund's investment adviser or its affiliates, and administrative fees payable to the investment adviser that are not included in the "Other Expenses" category. Management fees paid to mutual funds and other registered investment companies are set forth in the advisory agreement which must be approved by the fund's board and shareholders; in general, these fees are heavily regulated under the Investment Company Act of 1940.

== Private equity funds ==
In a private equity fund, the management fee is an annual payment made by the limited partners in the fund to the fund's manager (e.g., the private equity firm) to pay for the private equity firm's investment operations.

Often the management fee is initially based on the total investor commitments to the fund (i.e., the fund size) as investments are made. After the end of the commitment period, ordinarily four–six years, the basis for calculating the fee will change to the cost basis of the fund, less any investments that have been realized or written-off.

Management fees rates will range from 1.0% to 2.0% per annum during the initial commitment period and will then often step down by 0.5–1.0% from the original rate through the termination of the fund.

Typically, the managers will also receive an incentive fee based on the performance of the fund, known as the carried interest.

== Hedge funds ==
In a hedge fund, the management fee is calculated as a percentage of the fund's net asset value (the total of the investors' capital accounts) at the time when the fee becomes payable. Management fees typically range from 1% to 4% per annum. While 2% was long the standard, the average fell to an estimated 1.35% by 2022, the lowest level since 2008. Therefore, if a fund has $1 billion of assets at year-end and charges a 2% management fee, the management fee will be $20 million. Management fees are usually expressed as an annual percentage but both calculated and paid monthly (or sometimes quarterly or weekly) at annualized rates.
