= Operating expense =

Ongoing cost for running a product, business, or system

An operating expense (OpEx) (Note: Also known as operating expenditure, operational expense, operational expenditure, operating cost or operational cost.) is an ongoing cost for running a product, business, or system. Its counterpart, a capital expenditure (CapEx), is the cost of developing or providing non-consumable parts for the product or system. For example, the purchase of a photocopier involves capex, and the annual paper, toner, power and maintenance costs represents opex. For larger systems like businesses, opex may also include the cost of workers and facility expenses such as rent and utilities.

== Overview ==
In business, an operating expense is a day-to-day expense such as sales and administration, or research & development, as opposed to production. In short, this is the money the business spends in order to turn inventory into throughput.

On an income statement, "operating expenses" is the sum of a business's operating expenses for a period of time, such as a month or year.

In throughput accounting, the cost accounting aspect of the theory of constraints (TOC), operating expense is the money spent turning inventory into throughput. In TOC, operating expense is limited to costs that vary strictly with the quantity produced, like raw materials and purchased components. Everything else is a fixed cost, including labour (unless there is a regular and significant chance that workers will not work a full-time week when they report on their first day).

In a real estate context, operating expenses include costs associated with the operation and maintenance of an income-producing property.

Operating expenses include:

- salary and wages
- accounting expenses
- license fees
- maintenance and repairs, such as snow removal, trash removal, janitorial service, pest control, and lawn care
- advertising
- office expenses
- supplies
- attorney fees and legal fees
- utilities, such as telephone
- insurance
- property management, including a resident manager
- property taxes
- travel and vehicle expenses

Travel expenses are defined as those incurred in the event of travel required for professional purposes.

For this purpose, “travel” is defined as the simultaneous absence from the residence and from the regular place of employment. It is prompted by professional or company purposes and likely does not concern the traveler’s private life, or concerns it only to a small degree. Travel expenses include travel costs and fares, accommodation expenses, and so-called additional expenses for meals.

- leasing commissions

== See also ==
- Capital expenditure (capex)
- Total cost of ownership (TCO)
- Capital budgeting
- Freight expense
- Operating cost
- Overhead (business)
- Working capital
