= Ending inventory =

Concept in accounting and business management

Ending inventory is the amount of inventory a company has in stock at the end of its fiscal year. It is closely related with ending inventory cost, which is the amount of money spent to get these goods in stock. It should be calculated at the lower of cost or market.
