= Outline of production =

Overview of and topical guide to production

The following outline is provided as an overview of and topical guide to production:

Production – act of creating 'use' value or 'utility' that can satisfy a want or need. The act may or may not include factors of production other than labor. Any effort directed toward the realization of a desired product or service is a "productive" effort and the performance of such act is production.

The following outline is provided as an overview of and topical guide to production:

== Types ==
- Industry – production of an economic good or service within an economy. Industry is divided into four sectors, or types of production; they are:

=== Primary sector ===
- Primary sector – this involves the extraction of resources directly from the Earth, this includes agricultural and resource extraction industries. In these industries, the product (that is, the focus of production) is a natural resource.
  - Agriculture (outline) – cultivation of animals, plants, fungi, and other life forms for food, fiber, and other products used to sustain life.
    - Animal husbandry – agricultural practice of breeding and raising livestock.
    - Farming – cultivating land for the purpose of agricultural production.
    - Aquaculture – the farming of fish, crustaceans, molluscs, aquatic plants, algae, and other aquatic organisms.
    - Forestry (outline) – creating, managing, using, and conserving forests and associated resources in a sustainable manner to meet desired goals, needs, and values for human benefit.
  - Resource extraction –
    - Fishing – activity of catching or harvesting fish and other aquatic animals such as molluscs, cephalopods, crustaceans, and echinoderms.
    - Logging – harvesting timber, including cutting, skidding, on-site processing, and loading trees or logs onto trucks or skeleton cars.
    - Mining (outline) – extraction of valuable minerals or other geological materials from the earth, from an ore body, vein or (coal) seam.
    - Extraction of petroleum – process by which usable petroleum (oil) is extracted and removed from the earth.
    - Extraction of natural gas – Natural gas is commercially extracted from oil fields and natural gas fields.
    - Water industry – provides drinking water to residential, commercial, and industrial sectors of the economy.

=== Secondary sector ===
- Secondary sector – involves the processing of raw materials from primary industries, and includes the industries that produce a finished, tangible product.
  - Construction – process that consists of the building or assembling of infrastructure, including buildings, roads, dams, etc.
  - Manufacturing – process which involves tools and labor to produce goods for use or sale. Ranges from handicraft to high tech industrial production.

=== Tertiary sector ===
- Tertiary sector – This group is involved in the provision of services. They include teachers, managers and other service providers.

=== Quaternary sector ===
- Quaternary sector – the part of the economy that produces knowledge-based services.
  - Information industry –
    - Information generation and sharing –
    - Information technology –
  - Consulting services –
  - Education –
  - Research and development –
  - Financial planning services –

== Goals ==
- Product
- Service

=== Productivity ===
- Productivity
  - Benchmarking
  - Overall Equipment Effectiveness (OEE)
  - Cost accounting
  - Experience curve effects / Vocational education
  - Operations research
  - Scheduling and queuing theory
  - Throughput accounting
  - Time and motion study

== History ==
- History of industry
  - Industrial Revolution
- History of manufacturing

=== Theories of production ===
- Taylorism
- Fordism
- Theory of constraints
- Toyotism (Lean manufacturing)

== Economics ==
- Factors of production
- Production theory basics
- Outline of industrial organization
- Production function
- Production possibility frontier

== Manufacturing ==
- Manufacturing
- Artificiality
- Factory
- English system of manufacturing
- American system of manufacturing
- Scale of production
  - Craft production
  - Mass production
  - Batch production
  - Job production
- Just In Time manufacturing
- Toyota Production System
- Lean production
- Computer-aided manufacturing (CAM)
- Mass customization

=== Product engineering ===
- Product engineering
  - Industrial and manufacturing engineering
  - Reverse engineering
  - Value engineering

==== Product design ====
- Rapid prototyping
- Computer-aided design (CAD)
- New product development
- Research and development
- Toolkits for user innovation

=== Production technology ===
- Industrial robot
- Computer-aided manufacturing
- Computer Integrated Manufacturing
- Production equipment control
- Computer numerically controlled
- Distributed Control System
- Fieldbus control system
- PLCs / PLD
- Advanced Planning & Scheduling
- Scheduling (production processes)
- SCADA supervisory control and data acquisition
- computerized maintenance management system (CMMS)
- Packaging and labeling

==== Machinery ====
- Machinery
  - Production line
  - Assembly line
  - Conveyor belt
  - Woodworking machinery
  - Metalworking machinery
  - Textile machinery
  - Equipment manufacturer

==== Machine set-up ====
- Changeover
- Single-Minute Exchange of Die (SMED)
- Sequence-dependent setup (mathematical)

==== Lot size and run length ====
- Economic Lot Scheduling Problem
- Dynamic lot size model
- Economic order quantity
- Economic production quantity
- Economic batch quantity

== Service provision ==
- Service economy
- Service system
- Service design

== Logistics ==
- Logistics
  - Supply chain
  - Supply chain management
  - Procurement or purchasing
  - Inventory
    - Inventory management
    - Reorder point
    - Just In Time

== Process improvement ==
- Systems analysis
  - Process modeling
  - Process optimization
- Quality
  - Quality control
  - Six Sigma
  - Total Quality Management
- Certification Processes and Awards
  - ISO 9000
  - Malcolm Baldrige National Quality Award (US)
  - Canada Awards for Excellence (National Quality Institute) (Canada)
  - Deming Prize (Japan)
  - Joseph M. Juran Medal (US)
  - Japan Quality Control Medal (Japan)

== See also ==
- Division of labour
- Economics
- Means of production
- Mode of production
- Modernity
- Outline of management
- Outline of manufacturing
- Production possibility frontier
- Productive and unproductive labour
- Productive forces
- Productivity improving technologies (historical)
- Productivity model
- Second Industrial Revolution
