= Inventory control =

Ensuring the correct level of stock

Inventory control or stock control is the process of managing stock held within a warehouse, store or other storage location, including auditing actions concerned with "checking a shop's stock". These processes ensure that the right amount of supply is available within a business. However, a more focused definition takes into account the more science-based, methodical practice of not only verifying a business's inventory but also maximising the amount of profit from the least inventory investment without affecting customer satisfaction. Other facets of inventory control include forecasting future demand, supply chain management, production control, financial flexibility, purchasing data, loss prevention and turnover, and customer satisfaction.

An extension of inventory control is the inventory control system. This may come in the form of a technological system and its programmed software used for managing various aspects of inventory problems, or it may refer to a methodology (which may include the use of technological barriers) for handling loss prevention in a business. The inventory control system allows for companies to assess their current state concerning assets, account balances, and financial reports.

== Inventory control management ==
An inventory control system is used to keep inventories in a desired state while continuing to adequately supply customers, and its success depends on maintaining clear records on a periodic or perpetual basis.

Inventory management software often plays an important role in the modern inventory control system, providing timely and accurate analytical, optimization, and forecasting techniques for complex inventory management problems. Typical features of this type of software include:

- inventory tracking and forecasting tools that use selectable algorithms and review cycles to identify anomalies and other areas of concern
- inventory optimization
- purchase and replenishment tools that include automated and manual replenishment components, inventory calculations, and lot size optimization
- lead time variability management
- safety stock calculation and forecasting
- inventory cost management
- shelf-life and slow-mover logic
- multiple location support
- Mobile/Moving Inventory Support

Through this functionality, a business may better detail what has sold, how quickly, and at what price, for example. Reports could be used to predict when to stock up on extra products around a holiday or to make decisions about special offers, discontinuing products, and so on.

Inventory control techniques often rely upon barcodes and radio-frequency identification (RFID) tags to provide automatic identification of inventory objects—including but not limited to merchandise, consumables, fixed assets, circulating tools, library books, and capital equipment—which in turn can be processed with inventory management software. A new trend in inventory management is to label inventory and assets with a QR Code, which can then be read with smartphones to keep track of inventory count and movement. These new systems are especially useful for field service operations, where an employee needs to record inventory transaction or look up inventory stock in the field, away from the computers and hand-held scanners.

The control of inventory involves managing the physical quantities as well as the costing of the goods as they flow through the supply chain. In managing the cost prices of the goods throughout the supply chain, several costing methods are employed:

1. Retail method
2. Weighted Average Price method
3. FIFO (First In First Out) method
4. LIFO (Last In First Out) method
5. LPP (Last Purchase Price) method
6. BNM (Bottle neck method)

The calculation can be done for different periods. If the calculation is done on a monthly basis, then it is referred to as the periodic method. In this method, the available stock is calculated by:

ADD Stock at beginning of period
ADD Stock purchased during the period
AVERAGE total cost by total qty to arrive at the Average Cost of Goods for the period.

This Average Cost Price is applied to all movements and adjustments in that period.
Ending stock in qty is arrived at by Applying all the changes in qty to the Available balance.
Multiplying the stock balance in qty by the Average cost gives the Stock cost at the end of the period.

Using the perpetual method, the calculation is done upon every purchase transaction.

Thus, the calculation is the same based on the periodic calculation whether by period (periodic) or by transaction (perpetual).

The only difference is the 'periodicity' or scope of the calculation.

- Periodic is done monthly
- Perpetual is done for the duration of the purchase until the next purchase

In practice, the daily averaging has been used to closely approximate the perpetual method. 6. Bottle neck method (depends on proper planning support)

== Advantages and disadvantages ==
Inventory control systems have advantages and disadvantages, based on what style of system is being run. A purely periodic (physical) inventory control system takes "an actual physical count and valuation of all inventory on-hand ... at the close of an accounting period," whereas a perpetual inventory control system takes an initial count of an entire inventory and then closely monitors any additions and deletions as they occur. Various advantages and disadvantages, in comparison, include:

- Periodic is technically the more accurate as it considers both counted and valued inventory.
- Periodic is more time-consuming than perpetual.
- Perpetual can lower the cost of carrying inventory vs. periodic.
- Perpetual is typically more costly to run than periodic.
- Perpetual needs to be verified from time to time against an actual physical count, due to scrap, human error, theft, and other variables.

== Inventory control and inventory management ==
While these terms are sometimes used interchangeably, inventory management and inventory control deal with different aspects of inventory:

- Inventory management is a broader term pertaining to the regulation of all inventory aspects, from what is already present in the warehouse to how the inventory arrived and where the product's final destination will be. This management involves tracking field inventory throughout the supply chain, from sourcing to order fulfilment. It encompasses the entire process of procuring, storing, and profiting off merchandise or services.
- Inventory control is the process of managing stock once it arrives at a warehouse, store or other storage location. It is solely concerned with regulating what is already present, and involves planning for sales and stock-outs, optimizing inventory for maximum benefit and preventing the pile-up of dead stock.

== Business models ==
Just-in-time inventory (JIT), vendor managed inventory (VMI) and customer managed inventory (CMI) are a few of the popular models being employed by organizations looking to have greater stock management control.

JIT is a model that attempts to replenish inventory for organizations when the inventory is required. The model attempts to avoid excess inventory and its associated costs. As a result, companies receive inventory only when the need for more stock is approaching.

VMI (vendor managed inventory) and (co-managed inventory) are two business models that adhere to the JIT inventory principles. VMI gives the vendor in a vendor/customer relationship the ability to monitor, plan and control inventory for their customers. Customers relinquish the order making responsibilities in exchange for timely inventory replenishment that increases organizational efficiency.

CMI allows the customer to order and control their inventory from their vendors/suppliers. Both VMI and CMI benefit the vendor as well as the customer. Vendors see a significant increase in sales due to increased inventory turns and cost savings realized by their customers, while customers realize similar benefits.

== See also ==
- Automated identification and data capture – Methods of automatically identifying objects by computer system
- Document automation – Design of systems for electronic documents
- Economic lot scheduling problem – Problem in operations management and inventory theory
- Economic order quantity – Production scheduling model
- Inventory theory
- Newsvendor model – Mathematical model to assist inventory levels
- Scan-based trading
- Storage management system – Data storage technique
- Stock management – Function of understanding stock mix of a company and the different demands on that stock
- Supply chain management – Management of the flow of goods and services
- Vendor-managed inventory – Inventory management method
- Warehouse management system – Software designed to support and optimize warehouse and distribution center management
