= Humanitarian logistics =

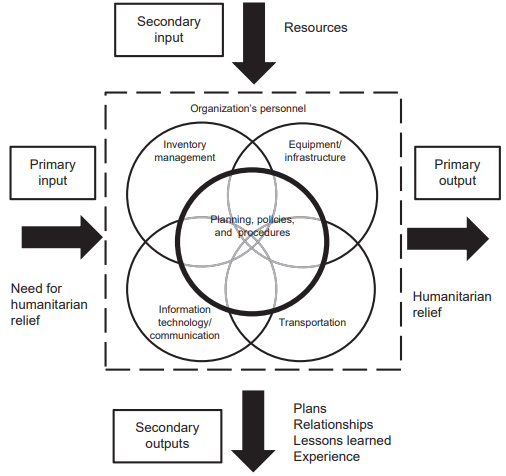
Visualizing Thomas's definition of humanitarian logistics

Although logistics has been mostly utilized in commercial supply chains, it is also an important tool in disaster relief operations. Humanitarian logistics is a branch of logistics which specializes in organizing the delivery and warehousing of supplies during natural disasters or complex emergencies to the affected area and people. However, this definition focuses only on the physical flow of goods to final destinations, and in reality, humanitarian logistics is far more complicated and includes forecasting and optimizing resources, managing inventory, and exchanging information. Thus, a good broader definition of humanitarian logistics is the process of planning, implementing and controlling the efficient, cost-effective flow and storage of goods and materials, as well as related information, from the point of origin to the point of consumption for the purpose of alleviating the suffering of vulnerable people.

This figure presents numerous important aspects in humanitarian logistics, including transport, inventory management, infrastructure, and communications.

== The role of humanitarian logistics in disaster relief efforts ==
Humanitarian logistics plays an integral role in disaster relief for several reasons. First, humanitarian logistics contributes immensely to mitigating the negative impact of natural disasters in terms of loss of life and economic costs. These losses occur in four different ways:

- Losses of buildings, highways and other infrastructure;
- Losses in output and reductions in employment and tax receipts;
- Losses due to the increase in the price of consumable and construction materials; and
- Losses of millions of lives because of the scarcity of food and accidents.

Second, humanitarian logistics is considered the repository of data that can be analyzed to provide post-event learning. Logistics data reflects all aspects, from the effectiveness of suppliers and transportation providers, to the cost and timeliness of response, to the appropriateness of donated goods and the management of information. Thus, it is critical to the performance of both current and future operations and programs. Organizing emergency response plans will help preparation and consequently mobilization in times of disasters.

== The process of humanitarian logistics ==
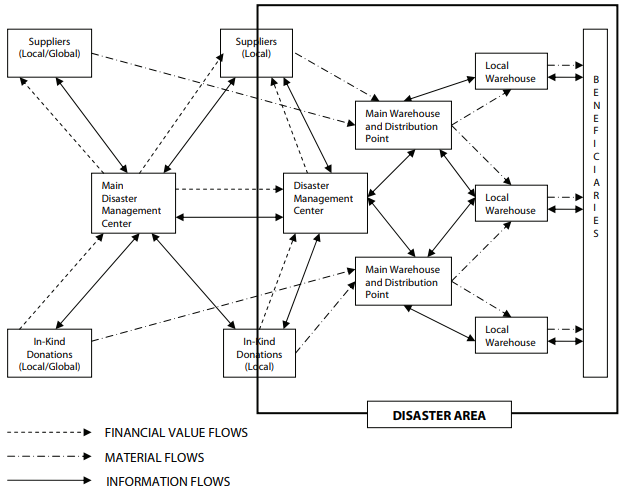
The process of humanitarian logistics

As can be seen in the above Figure, the process is complicated with the involvement of various actors in different locations. To be more specific, the process connects various actors, including, donors, local/international aid organizations, local governments, and beneficiaries. There are three fundamental flows in this process: the flow of material, the flow of money, and the flow of information.

- The flow of material: the flow of products from donors to beneficiaries, including food, blankets, medicines, and water, and the reverse flow of returned products after disasters.
- The flow of information: includes demand forecasts, order transmissions, and order status reports, to ensure preparedness and communications.
- The flow of money: includes checks, cash, and payment documents such as Letters of credit, invoice, and commercial contracts.

== Storage ==
Developing logistics warehousing to store all essential goods plays a crucial role in disaster response planning. Warehouses should be designed by taking precautions for contamination or waste of materials and organized in order to facilitate deliveries to the desired area at the desired time and quantities. In addition, responsible authorities aim at maximizing responsiveness and minimizing distribution times, total costs, and the number of distribution centers. The entire storage process is of key importance for preserving emergency supplies until they can be delivered to recipients.

=== Types of warehouse ===
Humanitarian Warehouses can be categorized into four main types, depending on their functions and locations.

- General Delivery Warehouses: where products are stored for a long time (e.g., months or quarters) or until they are sent to secondary warehouses or distributed in the field. General delivery warehouses are more common in the capital of beneficiary or donor countries or at strategic points of a given region (based on forecasts).

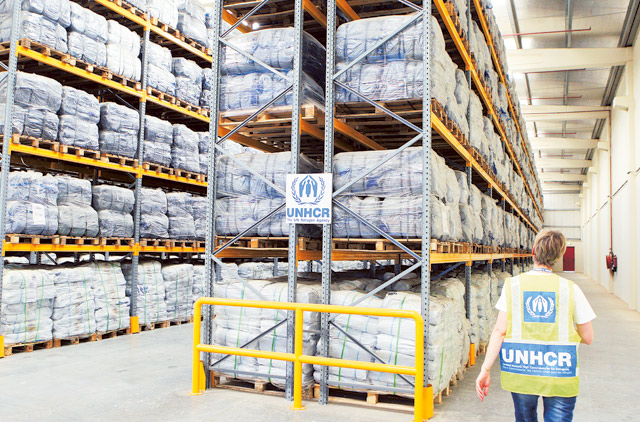
A general delivery warehouse of UNHCR

- Slow Rotation Warehouses: where non-urgent or reserve stockpiles are kept, including goods that are not in frequent demand such as spare parts, equipment, and tools.
- Quick Rotation Warehouses: where emergency supplies quickly move in and out, on a daily or at most weekly basis. Such warehouses are situated near the heart of affected zones and hold items that require prompt distribution among the affected population, including food, blankets, and hygiene items.

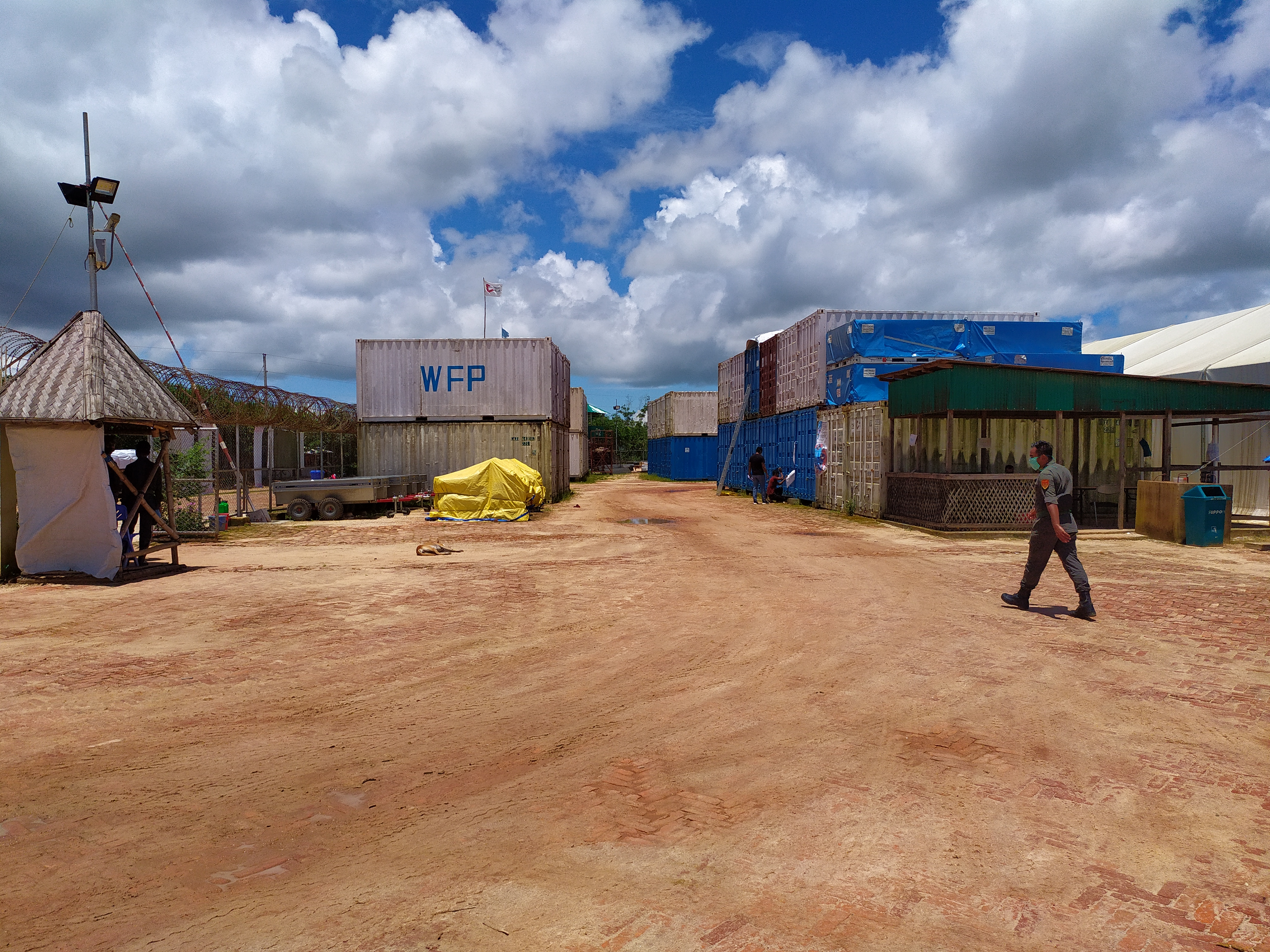
A slow rotation warehouse of WFP

- Temporary Collection Sites: where incoming supplies are stored until a more appropriate space can be found. Temporary collection sites include yards, offices, meeting rooms, and garages of disaster relief organizations.

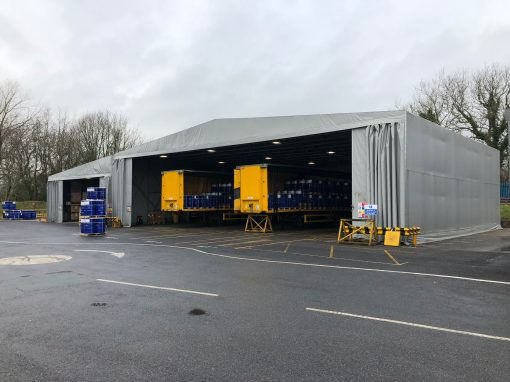
A temporary collection site

Humanitarian Warehouses can also be classified as perishables warehouses or 3PL warehouses. However, it is common in humanitarian logistics to have four types of warehouses as mentioned above. Depending on the magnitude of disasters and the urgency, a certain type of warehouses is needed. For example, for unexpected disasters, temporary warehouses are more common than others. In contrast, for planned disasters, general delivery warehouses are needed to store products in beneficiary countries.

=== Choices of warehouses ===
When selecting an appropriate site to store goods, two considerations are important:

- Type of supplies: Pharmaceutical products and foods require a well-ventilated, cool, dry place. Some of these products may even need temperature control. Other items, such as clothing or equipment, have more flexible requirements.
- Size and access to warehouses: the size of the storage site is significantly important. One must take into account not just its current capacity but also the potential for expansion of the storage area. Accessibility is another key issue, particularly for large vehicles.

== Inventory management ==
A logistical technique which can improve responsiveness is inventory pre-positioning. This technique is used for estimating item quantities required according to specific safety stock levels and order frequency, or for searching optimal locations for warehouses using facility location. Logistics is one of the major tools of disaster preparedness, among surveillance, rehearsal, warning, and hazard analysis. There are four primary types of inventory planning:

- Single-period inventory model/News-vendor model
- Base-stock model
- Periodic review model
- Dynamic lot-size model

Each model has different advantages and disadvantages; therefore, it is important for inventory planners to consider all aspects, including total holding costs, service level, and demand variability, to have an efficient strategy.

== Transport ==
Transport plays a key role in mobilizing supplies to help emergency humanitarian assistance reach affected regions. In humanitarian logistics, it is important to determine the feasibility of various forms of transport on the basis of the level of urgency, total costs, and geographical characteristics of affected zones.

=== Characteristics of different means of transport ===
Characteristics of different means of transport
Types of transport	Characteristics	Advantages	Disadvantages
Air (Airplanes)	Used when supplies are needed urgently, or when there is no other way to reach the affected area.	Quick and reliable.; Can reach far-away areas.; Makes it possible to come closer to the area of operations.	Costly.; Depending on the size of the plane, cargo capacity may be small.; Susceptible to meteorological conditions.; Requires plenty of space and safe conditions for landing and takeoff.; Requires special fuels, such as Jet A1, which although common are not always available in the area of operations.
Air (Helicopters)	More versatile than planes	Has limited cargo space.	Costly.
Land (motor vehicles)	Depends mainly on the physical and safety conditions of the access routes to the delivery points.	Highly flexible.; Inexpensive and readily available (it is easier to find cars and trucks than any other vehicle).; Given its availability, cargo capacity increases.	Routes might be in bad shape, impassable, or simply not exist.; Land travel may be dangerous in certain areas, due to the threat of landslides, floods, earthquake damage, armed conflict, or bandits.
Land (rail)	Depends on the existence and route of the railroad and its condition	Large load capacity.; Operating costs are generally quite low.	Frequently awkward to load and offload supplies in railroad yards or stations.; Need to use other transport to take the supplies to the warehouse or operations center.
Maritime	Used mostly for transporting supplies from abroad. Requires access to a harbor or pier.	Large load capacity.; Economical.	Slow.; Need to use other transport to take the supplies to the warehouse or operations center.
River	Useful for supplying riverside and nearby communities with moderate amounts of emergency aid, or for moving people and supplies in the event of a flood.	Low cost of operations.; Access to areas hard to reach by other forms of transport.	Small load capacity, depending on the size of the vessel.; Use depends on the size and other characteristics of the river or other waterway.
Intermodal	A combination of at least two means of transport, with the most common being truck/rail.	Faster delivery than rail.; Flexibility.	The exchange of information among transport companies.
Human and animal	Used for small loads, generally in remote areas or places (horses or camels).	Low operational costs.; Access to difficult areas.	Limited load capacity.; Slow.

=== Considerations of different means of transport ===
When planning the type and capacity of transport, five major considerations are crucial:

- The nature of supplies to be transported: Different categories of products requires different handling methods as well as temperature control. For example, hazardous materials must be stored separately from pharmaceutical products and food.
- The weight and volume of the load: Both are critical factors that determine the capacity of vehicles and the type of transport.
- The destination: distance, form of access to the delivery point (by air, water, or land). This factor should be taken into consideration because mobilizing the goods from the ports to the final destinations is often constrained by poor local infrastructure and unexpected events such as floods, landslides, and storms.
- The urgency of the delivery: In most emergency situations, needed goods, particularly food and fuels, are sent by air to destinations although this option is expensive. In humanitarian logistics, the priority is to save more lives.
- Alternative means, methods, and routes: Depending on one option represents a risk, especially there are some force majeure.

The below table provides a simple formula to help planners forecast transport demand during a disaster. There are three main components: the number of trips for a vehicle, the volume, and the total number of vehicles.

A simple formula for estimating the number of vehicles
Calculation procedure	Formula
Number of possible trips per vehicle	$\frac{Period}{Duration/ roundtrip}$
Number of loads	$\frac{Tons}{Capacity/vehicle}$
Number of vehicles	$\frac{Loads}{Trips/Vehicles}$

=== Types of transport contracts ===
There are three primary types of transport contracts. Each type has distinct advantages and disadvantages.

The comparisons of three main transport contract types
Types	Advantages	Disadvantages
By the ton or ton/km	Clients pay for the transport of the goods regardless of the time the trip takes or whether the truck is full or not.	Carriers might include other clients' loads in the same shipment, which may compromise the safety of supplies.; Drivers might use a less direct route to add kilometers to bills, which increases both time and costs.
Per vehicle per journey	Clients have the exclusive use of vehicle(s).	Carriers might not fill each vehicle to its maximum capacity in order to multiply the number of trips.; The size of vehicles might not be suitable with the size of loads, which leads to more vehicles and hence higher costs.
Per vehicle per day	Clients have the exclusive use of vehicle. It is usually the best option for short trips.	In the event that the truck needs protracted repairs, the daily fee might still be applicable unless stipulated otherwise in the contract.

== New technologies in humanitarian logistics ==
Technology is a key factor to achieve better results in disaster logistics. Setting up a communication mechanism in geographies that are remote and devoid of internet or phone networks, implementing up-to-date information or tracking systems & using humanitarian logistics software which can provide real-time supply chain information, organizations can enhance decision making, increase the quickness of the relief operations and achieve better coordination of the relief effort. Biometrics for identifying persons or unauthorized substances, wireless telecommunications, media technology for promoting donations, and medical technologies are some more aspects of technology applied in humanitarian operations. There are four main developments in this field: bar codes, AMS laser cards, radio frequency tags & satellite based internet services.

=== AMS Cards ===
Automated manifest system (AMS) cards have been used by the United States government to store substantial amounts of information about shipments. The cards have become more popular in humanitarian logistics as they are able to provide various aspects related to:

- Stock number;
- Requisition number;
- Shipment date;
- Quantity;
- Consignee.

The AMS cards are attached to both pallets and containers and inserted to a processing unit which can give all details about a delivery. The use of those cards is beneficial to both shippers and beneficiaries in humanitarian logistics management because beneficiaries can plan resources, especially food and medicines, or find alternatives. Therefore, this application can make the process more flexible and efficient. In addition, AMS cards are cheap, reusable, and resistant to extreme weather.

=== Radio Frequency Identification Tags and Labels ===
The tags are useful in identifying information about delivery routes. They are attached to different types of vehicles, including pallets, trucks, vans, and large containers, to position the location of shipments en route. In addition, they can read information when the vehicles pass through points along the route. After that, the information is stored on a label. Together with the AMS cards, they can provide an effective solution to humanitarian logistics to increase its transparency and responsiveness.

=== Bar Codes ===
One major concern in humanitarian logistics management is the reliability of product sources because the most popularly-procured item is food. In the past, there were cases regarding food unsafety caused by the unclear origins of products. Recently, bar codes have been a feasible solution to address this problem in humanitarian logistics. Bar code labels make it possible to represent alphanumeric characters (letters and numbers) by means of bars and blanks of varying widths that can be read automatically by optical scanners. This system recognizes and processes these symbols, compares their patterns with those already stored in computer memory, and interpret the information. This standardized coding system means that there can be a one-on-one, unique, non-ambiguous relationship between the pattern and that to which it refers. At present, bar codes are mostly used in:

- Product packages;
- Identification cards;
- Catalog or price lists;
- Product labels;
- Forms, receipts, and invoices.

=== Satellite based internet services ===
Communication, especially in the remote disaster zones is often difficult due to absence or damage to the mobile communication networks. During the Russian invasion of Ukraine in 2022, Starlink (Satellite internet) services opened a new possibility to restore this vital service capability.

== Environmental impact of humanitarian logistics ==
While the primary goal of humanitarian logistics is saving lives, their environmental impact has been a source of concern. Adverse environmental impact can emanate from all the operations throughout the humanitarian supply chain including procurement, transportation, warehousing, delivery, and material waste. Compared to commercial supply chains, addressing environmental issues is more challenging in humanitarian logistics due to volatile context and absence of basic infrastructure such as recycling facilities. However, several humanitarian organizations such as International Committee of Red Cross (ICRC) have recently started to incorporate sustainability in their long-term strategy. Use of digital technologies have shown to provide humanitarian organizations with more visibility across their supply chain and thus lead to more environmentally sustainable supply chains.

== See also ==
- United Nations Humanitarian Air Service
- United Nations Humanitarian Response Depot
- United Nations Office for the Coordination of Humanitarian Affairs
