= ABC analysis =

Materials management term

In materials management, ABC analysis is an inventory categorisation technique which divides inventory into three categories: 'A' items, with very tight control and accurate records, 'B' items, less tightly controlled and with moderate records, and 'C' items, with the simplest controls possible and minimal records. An ABC analysis provides a mechanism for identifying items that will have a significant impact on overall inventory cost, while also providing a mechanism for identifying different categories of stock that will require different management and controls.

The ABC analysis suggests that inventories of an organization are not of equal value. Thus, the inventory is grouped into three categories (A, B, and C) in order of their estimated importance. 'A' items are very important for an organization. Because of the high value of these items, frequent value analysis is required. In addition to that, an organization needs to choose an appropriate order pattern (e.g. "just-in-time") to avoid excess capacity. 'B' items are important, but less so than 'A' items, although more important than 'C' items. Therefore, 'B' items are intergroup items. 'C' items are marginally important.

== ABC analysis categories ==
There are no fixed thresholds for each class, and different proportions can be applied based on objectives and criteria which vary between companies. ABC analysis is similar to the Pareto principle in that the 'A' items will typically account for a large proportion of the overall value, but a small percentage of the number of items. Examples of ABC class are:

- 'A' items – 20% of the items account for 70% of the annual consumption value of the items
- 'B' items – 30% of the items account for 25% of the annual consumption value of the items
- 'C' items – 50% of the items account for 5% of the annual consumption value of the items

Another recommended breakdown of ABC classes:

1. "A" approximately 10% of items or 66.6% of value
2. "B" approximately 20% of items or 23.3% of value
3. "C" approximately 70% of items or 10.1% of value of the items

== ABC analysis in ERP packages ==
Major ERP packages have built-in function of ABC analysis. User can execute ABC analysis based on user defined criteria and system apply ABC code to items (parts).

In the absence of an ERP system, ABC Analysis can also be done in MS Excel.

== Mathematical calculation of ABC analysis ==
Computed (calculated) ABC analysis delivers a precise mathematical calculation of the limits for the ABC classes. It uses an optimization of cost (i.e. number of items) versus yield (i.e. sum of their estimated importance). Computed ABC was, for example, applied to feature selection for biomedical data, business process management and bankruptcy prediction.

== Example of the application of weighed operation based on ABC class ==
Actual distribution of ABC class in the electronics manufacturing company with 4,051 active parts.

Distribution of ABC class
ABC class	Number of items	Total amount required
A	20%	60%
B	20%	20%
C	60%	20%
Total	100%	100%

Using this distribution of ABC class and change total number of the parts to 14,213.

- Uniform purchase

When equal purchasing policy is applied to all 14,213 components, for example weekly delivery and re-order point (safety stock) of two weeks' supply, the factory will have 16,000 deliveries in four weeks and average inventory will be 2 1/2 weeks' supply.

Application of weighed purchasing condition
Uniform condition		Weighed condition	
Items	Conditions	Items	Conditions
All items 14,213	Re-order point=2 weeks' supply Delivery frequency=weekly	A-class items 200	Re-order point=1 week's supply Delivery frequency=weekly
All items 14,213	Re-order point=2 weeks' supply Delivery frequency=weekly	B-class items 400	Re-order point=2 weeks' supply Delivery frequency=bi-weekly
All items 14,213	Re-order point=2 weeks' supply Delivery frequency=weekly	C-class items 3,400	Re-order point=3 weeks' supply Delivery frequency=every 4 weeks

- Weighed purchase

In comparison, when weighed purchasing policy is applied based on ABC class, for example C class monthly (every four weeks) delivery with re-order point of three weeks' supply, B class bi-weekly delivery with re-order point of 2 weeks' supply, A class weekly delivery with re-order point of 1 week's supply, total number of delivery in 4 weeks will be (A 200×4=800)+(B 400×2=800)+(C 3,400×1=3,400)=5,000 and average inventory will be (A 75%×1.5weeks)+(B 15%x3 weeks)+(C 10%×3.5 weeks)=1.925 weeks' supply.

Comparison of "equal" and "weighed" purchase (4 weeks span)
ABC class	No of items	% of total value	Equal purchase		Weighed purchase		note
ABC class	No of items	% of total value	No of delivery in 4 weeks	average supply level	No of delivery in 4 weeks	average supply level	note
A	200	75%	800	2.5 weeks	800	1.5 weeks^{a}	same delivery frequency, safety stock reduced from 2.5 to 1.5 weeks^{a}, require tighter control with more man-hours.
B	400	15%	1600	2.5 weeks	800	3 weeks	increased safety stock level by 20%, delivery frequency reduced to half. Fewer man-hours required.
C	3400	10%	13,600	2.5 weeks	3,400	3.5 weeks	increased safety stock from 2.5 to 3.5 weeks' supply, delivery frequency is one quarter. Drastically reduced man-hour requirement.
Total	4,000	100%	16,000	2.5 weeks	5,000	1.925 weeks	average inventory value reduced by 23%, delivery frequency reduced by 69%. Overall reduction of man-hour requirement.

^{a)} A class item can be applied much tighter control like JIT daily delivery. If daily delivery with one day stock is applied, delivery frequency will be 4,000 and average inventory level of A class item will be 1.5 days' supply and total inventory level will be 1.025 weeks' supply, a reduction of inventory by 59%. Total delivery frequency is also reduced to half from 16,000 to 8,200.

- Result

By applying weighed control based on ABC classification, required man-hours and inventory level are drastically reduced.

- Alternate way of finding ABC analysis:-

The ABC concept is based on Pareto's law. If too much inventory is kept, the ABC analysis can be performed on a sample. After obtaining the random sample, the following steps are carried out for the ABC analysis.

- Step 1: Compute the annual usage value for every item in the sample by multiplying the annual requirements by the cost per unit.
- Step 2: Arrange the items in descending order of the usage value calculated above.
- Step 3: Make a cumulative total of the number of items and the usage value.
- Step 4: Convert the cumulative total of the number of items and usage values into a percentage of their grand totals.
- Step 5: Draw a graph connecting cumulative % items and cumulative % usage value. The graph is divided approximately into three segments, where the curve sharply changes its shape. This indicates the three segments A, B and C.

== See also ==
- Stock management
