= Ilkyeong Moon =

South Korean industrial engineer

Il-kyeong Moon
- Education: Columbia University (Ph.D.); Seoul National University (M.S., B.S.)
- Occupations: Industrial engineer, academic, author, and researcher
- Scientific career
- Fields: Industrial Engineering, Supply Chain Management, Operations Research
- Workplaces: Seoul National University (2012–present); Pusan National University (1992–2012); National University of Singapore (1991–1992); New Jersey Institute of Technology (1990)
- Website: Google Scholar Profile; SNU SCM Lab

Ilkyeong Moon (Korean: 문일경) is a South Korean professor of Industrial Engineering at Seoul National University (SNU). His research interests include operations research, supply chain management, and production planning, with a focus on the Economic Lot Scheduling Problem (ELSP), hybrid optimization algorithms, and maritime logistics. Moon is a member of the Division of Engineering of the Korean Academy of Science and Technology,. In addition, he serves as the Editor-in-Chief of the European Journal of Industrial Engineering.

== Education ==
Moon earned a bachelor's degree in industrial engineering from Seoul National University in 1984, followed by a master's degree from the same institution in 1986. He received a Ph.D. in operations research from Columbia University in 1991. After completing his doctoral studies, Moon held academic appointments at the New Jersey Institute of Technology and the National University of Singapore. In 1992, he joined the faculty of Pusan National University, where he worked until 2012. He later joined Seoul National University as a professor in the Department of Industrial Engineering. Moon has also conducted research as a visiting scholar at the University of Calgary, collaborating with Edward A. Silver on topics related to production and inventory management. In 2012, Moon joined the Department of Industrial Engineering at Seoul National University as a professor. His research at SNU has addressed applications in areas such as transportation systems, energy management, environmental systems, and aviation operations. He has also explored the use of emerging technologies including drones and foldable containers in logistics contexts. In 2024, he was elected to the fellow of the Korean Academy of Science and Technology. Moon has been listed in Stanford University's World's Top 2% Scientists list in multiple years. ScholarGPS ranks him within the top 0.25% of scholars worldwide in industrial engineering and lists him as a Highly Ranked Scholar. In 2025, he was elected a Fellow of the International Foundation for Production Research (IFPR).

== Research and contributions ==
Moon’s research spans areas including production planning, inventory management, scheduling, and supply chain optimization. His published work has addressed models such as:

- The Distribution Free Newsboy Problem
- Economic Lot Scheduling Problem (ELSP)
- Supply chain network optimization
- Hybrid genetic algorithms for scheduling problems
- Vehicle routing and logistics modeling

He leads several national research projects aimed at optimizing various operational management issues within smart cities. He is also responsible for a project on disaster response logistics systems utilizing drones, funded by the Ministry of Science and ICT.

=== Inventory and production systems ===
In the area of inventory management, Moon has proposed a distribution-free framework for addressing newsvendor-type inventory problems. This approach eliminates reliance on specific demand distributions and supports inventory decisions under uncertainty.

In production planning, he co-developed models for multi-item systems that incorporate externalized setup processes. These models aim to reduce stockouts and setup costs while improving scheduling efficiency in manufacturing environments.

=== Logistics and last-mile delivery ===
Moon’s research in logistics includes the development of models for last-mile delivery systems, incorporating emerging technologies such as drones. He co-developed a variant of the Traveling Salesman Problem, known as the TSP-Drone, which models collaboration between trucks and drone stations to improve delivery efficiency using metaheuristic optimization methods.

=== Maritime logistics and container management ===
In maritime logistics, Moon has conducted research on containerization with a focus on improving the efficiency of empty container repositioning. He co-authored a mathematical model evaluating the use of foldable containers to reduce repositioning costs and inefficiencies in global shipping networks.

== Major editorial activities ==
- Department Editor (2025–present): IEEE Transactions on Engineering Management
- Editor-in-Chief (2023−present): European Journal of Industrial Engineering
- Associate Editor (2014−present): Flexible Services and Manufacturing Journal
- Associate Editor (2010−2023): European Journal of Industrial Engineering
- Associate Editor (2005−2018): Asia-Pacific Journal of Operational Research (APJOR)
- Editor-in-Chief (2006−2008): Journal of the Korean Institute of Industrial Engineers
- Associate Editor (2001−2005): Journal of the Korean Institute of Industrial Engineers

== Awards and honors ==
- Fellow (2025−present): International Foundation for Production Research
- Fellow (2024−present): Korean Academy of Science and Technology
- Fellow (2018−present): Asia Pacific Industrial Engineering and Management Society
- Commendation for Contribution to Basic Research Promotion hosted by Ministry of Science and ICT, January 2025
- President (2019−2020): Korean Institute of Industrial Engineers
