= ELSP =

- École libre des sciences politiques
- Economic lot scheduling problem
