= Inventory turnover =

Measure of the number of times inventory is sold or used in a time period

In accounting, the inventory turnover is a measure of the number of times inventory is sold or used in a time period such as a year. It is calculated to see if a business has an excessive inventory in comparison to its sales level. The equation for inventory turnover equals the cost of goods sold divided by the average inventory. Inventory turnover is also known as inventory turns, merchandise turnover, stockturn, stock turns, turns, and stock turnover.

== Formulas ==
The formula for inventory turnover:

$$\text{Inventory Turnover}=\frac{\text{Net Sales}}{\text{Average Inventory at Selling Price}}$$

or

$$\text{Inventory Turnover}=\frac{\text{Cost of Goods Sold}}{\text{Average Inventory at Cost}}$$

or

Inventory Turnover = (Cost of Material − Change in inventories (of 1/2 and 1/1 goods))/Inventories

The most basic formula for average inventory:

$$\text{Average Inventory}=\frac{\text{Beginning inventory}+\text{Ending inventory}}{\text{2}}$$

or just

$$\text{Average Inventory}=\text{Ending inventory}$$

Multiple data points, for example, the average of the monthly averages, will provide a much more representative turn figure.

The average days to sell the inventory is calculated as follows:

$$\text{Average days to sell the inventory}=\frac{\text{365 days}}{\text{Inventory Turnover Ratio}}$$

== Application in business ==
A low turnover rate may point to overstocking, obsolescence, or deficiencies in the product line or marketing effort. However, in some instances a low rate may be appropriate, such as where higher inventory levels occur in anticipation of rapidly rising prices or expected market shortages. Another insight provided by the inventory turnover ratio is that if inventory is turning over slowly, then the warehousing cost attributable to each unit will be higher.

Conversely a high turnover rate may indicate inadequate inventory levels, which may lead to a loss in business as the inventory is too low. This often can result in stock shortages.

Some compilers of industry data (e.g., Dun & Bradstreet) use sales as the numerator instead of cost of sales. Cost of sales yields a more realistic turnover ratio, but it is often necessary to use sales for purposes of comparative analysis. Cost of sales is considered to be more realistic because of the difference in which sales and the cost of sales are recorded. Sales are generally recorded at market value, i.e. the value at which the marketplace paid for the good or service provided by the firm. In the event that the firm had an exceptional year and the market paid a premium for the firm's goods and services then the numerator may be an inaccurate measure. However, cost of sales is recorded by the firm at what the firm actually paid for the materials available for sale. Additionally, firms may reduce prices to generate sales in an effort to cycle inventory. In this article, the terms "cost of sales" and "cost of goods sold" are synonymous.

An item whose inventory is sold (turns over) once a year has higher holding cost than one that turns over twice, or three times, or more in that time. Stock turnover also indicates the briskness of the business. The purpose of increasing inventory turns is to reduce inventory for three reasons.

- Increasing inventory turns reduces holding cost. The organization spends less money on rent, utilities, insurance, theft and other costs of maintaining a stock of good to be sold.
- Reducing holding cost increases net income and profitability as long as the revenue from selling the item remains constant.
- Items that turn over more quickly increase responsiveness to changes in customer requirements while allowing the replacement of obsolete items. This is a major concern in fashion industries.
- When making comparison between firms, it's important to take note of the industry, or the comparison will be distorted. Making comparison between a supermarket and a car dealer, will not be appropriate, as supermarket sells fast-moving goods such as sweets, chocolates, soft drinks so the stock turnover will be higher. However, a car dealer will have a low turnover due to the item being a slow moving item. As such only intra-industry comparison will be appropriate.
- Even within industry, inventory turns can vary across firms for various reasons, such as the amount of product variety, the extent of price discounts offered, and the structure of the supply chain.

== Note ==
Some computer programs measure the stock turns of an item using the actual number sold.

$$\text{Inventory  Turn} = \frac{\text{Number  of  Units  Sold  (Over  a  given  period)}}{\text{Average  Number of  Units  (For  the  period)}}$$

The important issue is that any organization should be consistent in the formula that it uses.

== See also ==
- Cost accounting
- Inventory
- Inventory management software
- Throughput accounting
- Stock rotation
