= EBQ =

EBQ may refer to:

- Economic batch quantity.
- The economic batch quantity model, or production lot size model is similar to EOQ model in that an optimum number is to be calculated for the batch quantity to be produced.
- EBq (exabecquerel), a multiple of Becquerel, a unit of radioactivity
