= Jack D. Rogers =

American academic

Jack D. Rogers (1919 – January 15, 2002) was an American management scientist, and professor emeritus in the Haas School of Business at the University of California, Berkeley, who coined the term Economic lot scheduling problem in 1958.

== Biography ==
Born in Nebraska, Rogers received in 1942 his BA and in 1947 his MBA from the University of California, Berkeley, and in 1953 his PhD from the Massachusetts Institute of Technology.

In 1950 Rogers started his academic career at the University of California, Berkeley as lecturer. From 1957 to 1965 he chaired the faculty group in Production Management, and in 1972 he was appointed Professor of Management Science at the Walter A. Haas School of Business. He also directed the M.B.A. program of the business school. In 1983 he retired and became professor emeritus.

Rogers served on the editorial board of the California Management Review and Management Science.

== Publications ==
Rogers published multiple articles in the field of Management Science. A selection:

- 1958. "A Computational Approach to the Economic Lot Scheduling Problem", Management Science, Vol. 4, No. 3, April 1958, pp. 264–291
- 1967. "An Algorithm and Computational Procedure for Locating Economic Facilities." Management Science. Vol 13. 3(6). p. 240–254
