= Carrying cost =

Total cost of holding inventory

In marketing, carrying cost, carrying cost of inventory or holding cost refers to the total cost of holding inventory. This includes warehousing costs such as rent, utilities and salaries, financial costs such as opportunity cost, and inventory costs related to perishability, shrinkage, and insurance. Carrying cost also includes the opportunity cost of reduced responsiveness to customers' changing requirements, slowed introduction of improved items, and the inventory's value and direct expenses, since that money could be used for other purposes. When there are no transaction costs for shipment, carrying costs are minimized when no excess inventory is held at all, as in a just-in-time production system.

Excess inventory can be held for one of three reasons. Cycle stock is held based on the re-order point, and defines the inventory that must be held for production, sale or consumption during the time between re-order and delivery. Safety stock is held to account for variability, either upstream in supplier lead time, or downstream in customer demand. Physical stock is held by consumer retailers to provide consumers with a perception of plenty. Carrying costs typically range between 20 and 30% of a company's inventory value.

== Definitions ==
The cost consists of four different factors:

1. The expenses of putting the inventory in storage
2. Salary and wages of workers
3. Maintenance, or upkeep, during the inventory period
4. All utilities used in carrying the storage.

Costs associated with staff whose roles are mainly concerned with inventory, including inventory managers and controllers, stockkeepers, material handlers and cycle counters, should be included.

The carrying cost usually appears as a percentage. It provides an idea of how long the inventory could be held before the company makes a loss, which also tells the manager how much to order.

== Why do companies hold inventory ==
Inventory is a property of a company that is ready for them to sell. There are five basic reasons that a company would need inventory.

1. Safety inventory

This would act like a buffer to make sure that the company would have excess products for sale if consumer demands exceed their expectation.

2. Cater to Cyclical and Seasonal Demand

These kinds of inventory is used for predictable events that would cause a change in people's demand. For example, candy companies can start to produce extra sweets that have a long duration period. Build up seasonal inventory gradually to match people's sharply increasing demand before Halloween.

3. Cycle inventory

Cycle inventory reflects the concept of an economic order quantity (EOQ). EOQ is an attempt to balance inventory holding or carrying costs with the costs incurred in ordering or setting up machinery. The total cost will minimized when the ordering cost and the carrying cost are equal to each other. When customers order a significant quantity of products, cycle inventory would be able to save costs and act as a buffer for the company to purchase more supplies.

4. In-transit Inventory

This kind of inventory would save the company a lot of transportation costs and help the transition process become less time-consuming. For example, if the company requests a particular raw material from an overseas market. Purchase in bulk will save them a lot of transportation cost from overseas shipment fees.

5. Dead Inventory

"Dead inventory", or "dead stock" consists of stock that is outdated or where only a few consumers request this kind of product. Such stock is likely to have been withdrawn from store shelves. To reduce costs of holding this kinds of products, company could hold discount events or imply price reduction to attraction consumers attentions.

== Ways to reduce carrying cost ==
Most businesses see profit maximizing as their primary objective. To reach higher profit here are some methods of reducing carrying costs.

1. Base the amount of stock held on the economic situation: The amount of stock held should be changed with consumers' demand, the situation of the industry and the exchange rate of the currency. When the economy is in recession or the currency depreciates, residents’ purchasing power would decrease.

2. Improve the layout of the warehouse: Instead of renting a new place, the manager might consider about the idea of rearrange the layout of the warehouse that they owned. An inefficient layout may increase the risk of shipping the wrong products to consumers this would both increase transportation cost and become time-consuming. To improve the layout the company could either increase the reception area or apply segmentation. This will reduce the cost as well as increase labour's productivity!

3. Build long-term agreements with suppliers: Signing long-term contract with suppliers may increase the supplier's financial security and the company may receive a lower price. This will become a win-win situation. Also the supplier might be willing to decrease the time period of delivery their products to the warehouse, for example from once a month to once a week. Hence, the company would be able to switch to a smaller warehouse, as they don't need to stock that much products at a time. Furthermore, this would also reduce the risks of loss and depreciation of the products.

4. Creating an effective database: The database should include things like retailer, date, quantity, quality, degree of advertising and the time taken until sold out. This will make sure that future employees can learn from the past experience while making decisions. For example, if the manager want to hold a big discount event to clear the products that have been left in stock for a long time. Then he can go through the past data to find out if there is any event like this before and how was the result. The manager would be able to forecast the budget and make some improvements base on the past events’ record.

== See also ==
- Cost accounting
- Inventory
- Inventory turnover
- Theory of constraints
- Throughput accounting
- Weighted average cost of capital
