= Inventory management software =

Software used to track inventory levels and stock movement

Inventory management software is software used to record, track, and manage inventory levels, orders, sales, deliveries, and related stock movements. It is used in fields including retail, warehousing, distribution, and manufacturing. In manufacturing environments, such software may also be used alongside production-planning systems to support work orders, bills of materials, and related planning records. Inventory management software is intended to help organizations reduce stock shortages and limit overstocking by maintaining more systematic records of inventory and its movement.

== Functions ==
Inventory management software typically includes functions for monitoring stock quantities, recording receipts and issues, and supporting replenishment decisions. Common functions include maintaining stock records across one or more locations, tracking goods as they move between suppliers, warehouses, and retail sites, and supporting warehouse activities such as receiving, picking, packing, and shipping.

=== Reorder point ===
Many inventory systems support the use of a reorder point, that is, a stock level at which replenishment should be initiated. Reorder-point methods are part of broader inventory-control practice concerned with determining when to replenish stock and in what quantity.

=== Product identification and tracking ===
Inventory systems commonly identify items through barcodes, serial numbers, lot numbers, or similar markers. More recent systems may also use radio-frequency identification (RFID), networked sensors, and other automated identification technologies to improve traceability and reduce manual data entry.

== History ==
The Universal Product Code (UPC) was adopted as a standard in 1973, and the first retail scan of a UPC-marked product took place in June 1974 at a Marsh supermarket in Troy, Ohio. The spread of barcode systems made machine-readable stock records more practical for retailers and later for other sectors.

The increasing availability of personal computers and business software in the early 1980s also made computerized record-keeping more accessible. Database, spreadsheet, and other business applications became more widely available on relatively inexpensive hardware, making software-based inventory records increasingly practical for firms that had previously relied on manual systems.

More recent inventory management systems have incorporated technologies such as barcode scanning, RFID, and the Internet of things (IoT), while also facing integration challenges in multi-location and enterprise settings.

== Use in manufacturing ==
In manufacturing, inventory management software is often used together with production planning and enterprise resource planning (ERP) systems. Such systems may support material planning, bills of materials, production activity control, and related functions used to coordinate raw materials, work-in-process inventory, and finished goods.

== Deployment and integration ==
Inventory management software may be installed locally or delivered as software as a service. In larger organizations, inventory functions are often integrated with wider transaction-processing or ERP systems that link sales, production, warehousing, finance, and logistics.

== See also ==
- Document automation – Design of systems for electronic documents
- Enterprise resource planning – Corporate task of optimizing the existing resources in a company
- Inventory control system – Ensuring the correct level of stock
- Operations management – In business operations, controlling the process of production of goods
- Supply chain management – Management of the flow of goods and services
- Vendor-managed inventory – Inventory management method
- Warehouse management system – Software designed to support and optimize warehouse and distribution center management
