= Ford Whitman Harris =

American production engineer

- Born: August 8, 1877
- Died: October 27, 1962 (aged 85)

Ford Whitman Harris (August 8, 1877 – October 27, 1962) was an American production engineer who derived the square-root formula for ordering inventory now known as the economic order quantity, which has appeared in countless academic articles and texts over the past 100 years.

== Career ==
Born in 1877 and having grown up in Portland, after finishing high school he worked for four years as an engineering apprentice and draftsman for Belknap Motor Company and Maine Electric Company. In 1900 he moved to Pittsburgh, where he became a draftsman and engineer for Heyl and Patterson. From 1904 to 1912 Harris worked for Westinghouse Electric and Manufacturing Company. Ford W. Harris married Eugenia Mellon.

Harris was also a self-taught attorney, and was the first president of the Los Angeles Intellectual Property Law Association (1934-35).

== Published works ==
- "How many parts to make at once", Factory, The Magazine of Management, Volume 10, Number 2, February 1913
- "How much stock to keep at hand", Factory, The Magazine of Management 1913
- "Patents from a Patent Attorney's viewpoint", Machinery 1914
- "What quantity to make at once", The Library of Factory Management 1915
- "Inventions, patents, and the engineer", Electr. Eng. 1943

== See also ==
- Thomson M. Whitin
- Harvey M. Wagner
- Economic order quantity
