= Safety stock =

Extra stock kept to mitigate risks

Safety stock is a term used by logisticians to describe a level of extra stock which is maintained to mitigate the risk of stockouts, which can be caused, for example, by shortfalls in raw material availability or uncertainty in forecasting supply and demand. Adequate safety stock levels permit business operations to proceed according to their plans. Safety stock is held when uncertainty exists in demand, supply, or manufacturing yield, and serves as an insurance against stockouts.

Safety stock is an additional quantity of an item held in the inventory to reduce the risk that the item will be out of stock. It acts as a buffer stock in case sales are greater than planned and/or the supplier is unable to deliver the additional units at the expected time.

With a new product, safety stock can be used as a strategic tool until the company can judge how accurate its forecast is after the first few years, especially when it is used with a material requirements planning (MRP) worksheet. The less accurate the forecast, the more safety stock is required to ensure a given level of service. With an MRP worksheet, a company can judge how much it must produce to meet its forecasted sales demand without relying on safety stock. However, a common strategy is to try to reduce the level of safety stock to help keep inventory costs low once the product demand becomes more predictable. That can be extremely important for companies with a smaller financial cushion or those trying to run on lean manufacturing, which is aimed towards eliminating waste throughout the production process.

The amount of safety stock that an organization chooses to keep on hand can dramatically affect its business. Too much safety stock can result in high holding costs of inventory. In addition, products that are stored for too long a time can spoil, expire, or break during the warehousing process. Too little safety stock can result in lost sales and a higher rate of customer turnover. As a result, finding the right balance between too much and too little safety stock is essential.

== Reasons for keeping safety stock ==
Safety stocks are mainly used in a make to stock manufacturing strategy, which is employed when the lead time of manufacturing is too long to satisfy the customer demand at the right cost/quality/waiting time.

The main goal of safety stocks is to absorb the variability of customer demand. Indeed, production planning is based on a forecast, which is (by definition) different from the real demand. By absorbing these variations, safety stock improves the customer-service level.

Creating a safety stock will also delay stockouts from other variations, like an upward trend in customer demand, allowing time to adjust capacity.

Safety stock is used as a buffer to protect organizations from stockouts caused by inaccurate planning or poor schedule adherence by suppliers. As such, its cost (in both material and management) is often seen as a drain on financial resources that results in reduction initiatives. In addition, time-sensitive goods such as food, drink, and other perishable items could spoil and go to waste if held as safety stock for too long. Various methods exist to reduce safety stock; these include better use of technology, increased collaboration with suppliers, and more accurate forecasting. In a lean supply environment, lead times are reduced, which can help minimize safety stock levels, thus reducing the likelihood and impact of stockouts. Due to the cost of safety stock, many organizations opt for a service level-led safety stock calculation; for example, a 95% service level could result in stockouts, but is at a level that is acceptable to the company. The lower the service level, the lower the requirement for safety stock.

An enterprise resource planning system (ERP system) can also help an organization reduce its level of safety stock. Most ERP systems provide a type of production planning module. An ERP module such as this can help a company develop highly accurate and dynamic sales forecasts and sales and operations plans. By creating more accurate and dynamic forecasts, a company reduces its chance of producing insufficient inventory for a given period, thus should be able to reduce the amount of safety stock required. In addition, ERP systems use established formulas to help calculate appropriate levels of safety stock based on the previously developed production plans. While an ERP system aids an organization in estimating a reasonable amount of safety stock, the ERP module must be set up to plan requirements effectively.

== Inventory policy ==
The size of the safety stock depends on the type of inventory policy in effect. An inventory node is supplied from a "source" which fulfills orders for the considered product after a certain replenishment lead time. In a periodic inventory policy, the inventory level is checked periodically (such as once a month) and an order is placed at that time as to meet the expected demand until the next order. In this case, the safety stock is calculated considering the demand and supply variability risks during this period plus the replenishment lead time. If the inventory policy is continuous policy (such as an order point-order quantity policy or an order point-order up to policy) the inventory level is continuously monitored and orders are placed with freedom of time. In this case, safety stock is calculated considering the risk of only the replenishment lead time. If applied correctly, continuous inventory policies can lead to smaller safety stock whilst ensuring higher service levels, in line with lean processes and more efficient overall business management. However, continuous inventory policies are much harder to implement, so most of the organisations using traditional planning processes and tools opt for periodic inventory policy.

== Methods for calculating safety stocks ==
=== Reorder point method with demand and lead time uncertainty for type I service ===
A commonly used approach calculates the safety stock based on the following factors:

- Demand is the number of items consumed by customers, usually a succession of independent random variables.
- Lead time is the delay between the time the reorder point (inventory level which initiates an order) is reached and renewed availability.
- Service level is the desired probability of meeting demand during the lead time without a stockout. If the service level is increased, the required safety stock increases, as well.
- Forecast error is an estimate of how far actual demand may be from forecast demand.

Assuming that demand during successive unit time periods are independent and identically distributed random variables drawn from a normal distribution, the safety stock can be calculated as:

$SS=z_\alpha\times\sqrt{E(L)\sigma^2_D + (E(D))^2\sigma^2_L}$

where,

- $\alpha$ is the service level, and $z_\alpha$ is the inverse distribution function of a standard normal distribution with cumulative probability $\alpha$; for example, $z_\alpha$=1.65 for 95% service level. The service level can be easily calculated in Excel by typing in the formula =normsinv(probability%). For example, entering =normsinv(95%) will return 1.65 as the answer.
- $E(L)$ and $\sigma_L$ are the mean and standard deviation of lead time.
- $E(D)$ and $\sigma_D$ are the mean and standard deviation of demand in each unit time period.

The reorder point can then be calculated as:

$ROP = E(L)\cdot E(D)+SS$

The first term in the ROP formula $E(L)E(D)$ is the average demand during the lead time. The second term $ss$ is the safety stock. If the lead time is deterministic, i.e. $\sigma_L=0$, then the ROP formula is simplified as $ROP = L\cdot E(D) + z_\alpha \sigma_D \sqrt{L}$.

==== Issues with this approach ====
No universal formula exists for safety stock, and application of the one above can cause serious damage. It makes several implicit assumptions:

- The assumption that demand is a succession of independent normal random variables: First, real demand cannot be negative. If the ratio of standard deviation to mean is quite high, this will skew the distribution (compared to the normal distribution), leading to consistent overestimation of safety stock by this formula. Second, and more importantly, demand is often influenced by external random factors which persist for more than one time period, so that the successive demands are not independent. With a very large number of sources (for example, consumers of a central retail warehouse), that may not be an issue, but otherwise it is (for example, for a manufacturer that supplies these retail warehouses)
- The use of average and standard demand assumes it is constant. For seasonal demand (for example high in summer, low in winter), the formula will consistently produce stock outs in summer and waste in winter. Similar errors apply for demand that grows or declines. That does not invalidate the formula, but it influences the parameters to be input into the formula in each time period.
- Lead time is extremely hard to quantify in complex manufacturing and/or purchase environment, which has become the norm in global supply chains that span many independent partners. In practice, lead time is estimated by a rule of thumb that hardly improves on estimating safety stock with a rule of thumb. Even when lead time is correctly quantified, the formula assumes supply (production and purchase) is statistically constant, which is not always the case.

=== Type II service ===
Another popular approach described by Nahmias uses the standardized unit loss integral L(z), given by:

$L(z)=\int_{z}^{+\infty }\left ( t-z \right )\phi(t)dt$

Where $\phi(t)$ is cumulative distribution function for the standard normal. Let β be the proportion of demands met from stock (service level), Q the order quantity and σ the standard deviation of demand, then the following relationship holds:

$L(z)=(1-\beta)Q/\sigma$

In this case, the safety stock is given by:

$SS=z_\beta\sigma$

and the expected number of units out of stock during an order cycle is given by σL(z).

=== Virtual Safety Stock (VSS) ===
A more recent approach in inventory optimization is the Virtual Safety Stock (VSS). Unlike traditional safety stock, which relies solely on physical on-hand inventory, VSS leverages the "delivery slack time" (the difference between the maximum time a customer is willing to wait and the actual lead time) to reduce physical inventory levels without affecting the perceived service level. This methodology allows for a strategic trade-off between physical stock and time-based flexibility.

== See also ==
- Buffer stock scheme
- Service level
- Reorder point
