= Inventory management (business) =

Function of understanding stock mix of a company and the different demands on that stock

Inventory management, also known as field inventory management, is the task of understanding the range and quantities of inventory (or "stock") held by a company and the handling of the different demands placed on that stock. The demands are influenced by both external and internal factors and are balanced by the creation of purchase order requests to keep supplies at a reasonable or prescribed level. Inventory management is important for every business enterprise. It includes tasks related to setting and reviewing inventory targets efficiently.

== Overview ==
A typical inventory management process for a retail business follows the following sequence:

1. A forecast of how much inventory needs to be held, and the stock mix to which it relates.
2. Request for new inventory from stores to head office,
3. Head office issues a purchase order to the vendor,
4. Vendor ships the goods,
5. Warehouse receives the goods,
6. Warehouse stores and distributes to the stores,
7. Shops and/or consumers (e.g. wholesale shops) receive the goods,
8. Goods are sold to customers at the shops.

Gartner's research in 2017 found that many businesses take subjective approaches to determining how much inventory they should hold in their distribution centers and stores. They argue instead that leading businesses have the potential to calculate optimal inventory holding targets more effectively without jeopardizing sales.

== Software applications ==
Inventory management software is a tool to help efficiently manage stock. While the capabilities of applications vary, most inventory management applications give organizations a structured method of accounting for all incoming and outgoing inventory within their facilities. Organizations may save costs associated with manual inventory counts, administrative errors and reductions in inventory stock-outs.

Often tracking stock just through sales and returns is not enough for retailers and does not meet the demands of customers multichannel expectations. Customers expect retailers to have real-time knowledge of stock availability. This can be a challenge for retailers who may have on-line as well as bricks and mortar outlets.

An inventory management system typically provides a comprehensive stock listing with size and colour matrices, alongside real-time reporting on sales performance, supply chain activity, and sales staff metrics.

Many large organizations use sophisticated ERP systems such as Oracle EBS and SAP for inventory management. Stock modules in these ERP systems provide many of the options needed to manage inventory.

The stock size needs to correspond to the amount of products which are sold. If the stock is too large (especially with perishable goods such as fruit and vegetables) there is a risk of financial losses as some of the inventory may spoil while sitting in the store. To reduce this risk (and keep financial losses as small as possible), there is hence benefit in precisely recording the weekly purchases of the shop's customers. This can be done through purchases tracking per individual shopper.

== See also ==
- Automated identification and data capture
- Document automation
- Economic order quantity
- Economic lot scheduling problem
- Newsvendor model
- Scan-based trading
- Storage management system
- Supply chain management
- Vendor-managed inventory
- Warehouse management system
