= International Supply Chain Education Alliance =

Professional organization

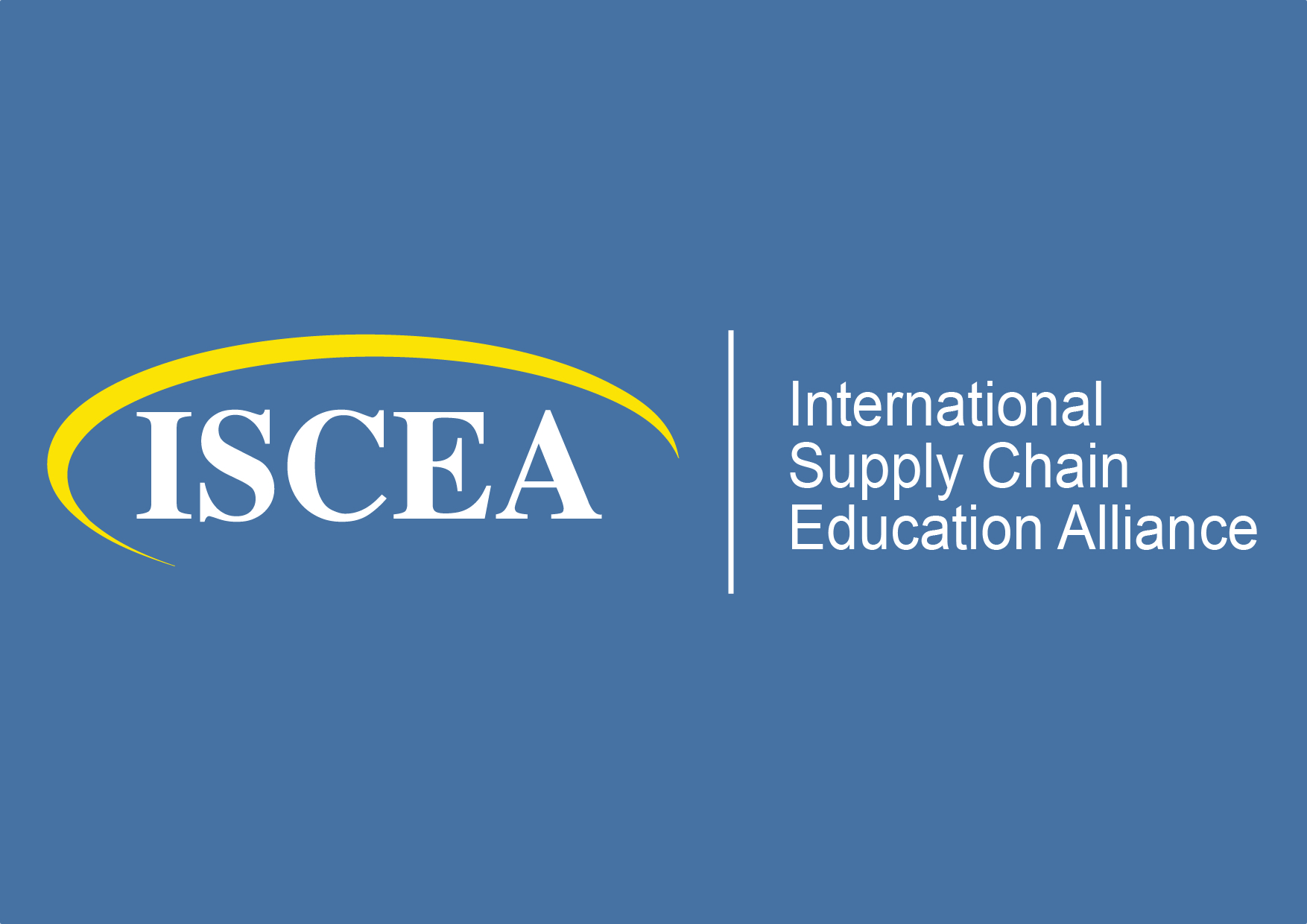
- ISCEA Logo
- Abbreviation: ISCEA
- Headquarters: 2000 Auburn Drive; Suite 200; Beachwood, OH, USA 44122
- Region served: Global
- Main organ: IISB - ISCEA International Standards Board
- Website: iscea.org

The International Supply Chain Education Alliance (ISCEA) is a certifying body. Founded in 2003 and currently holding over 100,000 members, ISCEA has its World HQ office in Beachwood, OH, USA and regional offices in LATAM, EMEA and APAC. ISCEA is the governing body for the Ptak Prize.

Besides Certified Supply Chain Manager (CSCM) certification, ISCEA has developed several professional certification programs that include: Certified Supply Chain Analyst (CSCA), Certified Lean Master (CLM), Certified RFID Supply Chain Manager (RFIDSCM), Certified Demand Driven Planner (CDDP), Certified HealthCare Supply Chain Analyst (CHSCA); and Certified Lean Six Sigma Yellow Belt (CLSSYB), Green Belt (CLSSGB) and Black Belt (CLSSBB).

== History ==
=== First Supply Chain Management Certification ===
The term Supply Chain Management (SCM) was coined in the early eighties (1982) by Booz Allen Consultant, Keith Oliver, but remained only a buzzword for many years. The holistic concept of a cross-functional set of processes aimed to fulfill the customer's needs, started to make sense to companies, consultants and academics in the early nineties. It was until the decade's end, when technology enabled Business Process Integration throughout each company and extended to other companies, that the term SCM was widely adopted. SCM finally grew to become normal science in the first decade of the millennium.

ISCEA's founding members identified the need of a professional SCM certification organization and developed the Certified Supply Chain Manager (CSCM) certification program. It was the first certification program developed by ISCEA and was launched simultaneously with ISCEA's initial website in early 2003. There are other professional knowledge certifying bodies currently offering SCM certification. Some of them founded many years before ISCEA. But their SCM certification programs were released after ISCEA's CSCM:

- APICS, Founded in 1957 as American Production and Inventory Control Society and re-branded as The Association for Supply Chain Management in 2018, launched their CSCP (Certified Supply Chain Professional) programme in 2006. Three years after ISCEA's CSCM.
- Institute for Supply Management, Founded in 1915 as National Association of Purchasing Agents, launched their CPSM Certified Professional in Supply Management programme in 2008. Five years after ISCEA's CSCM.
- Council of Supply Chain Management Professionals, Founded in 1963 as Council of Logistics Management, launched their SCPro programme in 2011. Eight years after ISCEA's CSCM.

=== IISB - ISCEA International Standards Board ===
From 2005 to 2020 Mr. Mike Sheahan, former International President of APICS, served as President of ISCEA International Standards Board (IISB). On June 30, 2020, Mr. Sheahan became "President Emeritus" and Dr. Erick C. Jones became "President-Elect", assuming the IISB leadership role.

Dr. Jones has been in the IISB Board of Directors since 2005 and is currently Chair of the IISB Technology Committee, Engineering Research Center Program Director at the National Science Foundation, Editor in Chief of the International Supply Chain Technology Journal (ISCTJ), the George and Elizabeth Pickett Endowed Professor in the Department of Industrial and Manufacturing Systems Engineering (IMSE) and Associate Dean for Graduate Studies in the College of Engineering at the University of Texas at Arlington.

ISCEA International Standards Board members also include Justin Goldston, Professor & Coordinator of Project and Supply Chain Management at Penn State University, Dr. Charles A. Watts, executive director of Education and Certification Programs at ISCEA and also Professor in the Department of Management, Marketing, and Logistics at John Carroll University; Dr. Kenneth Paetsch, former professor of Cleveland State University (CSU) and the University of Illinois Springfield (UIS); Dr. Gerald (Jerry) Ledlow, Dean of UT Health Science Center at Tyler School of Community and Rural Health; Erich Heneke, Director of Business Integrity Continuity in Mayo Clinic's Supply Chain Management (SCM); Mike Loughrin, President of Transformance Advisors; Renata Rieder, Head of Service Management at Federal Office of Information Technology, Systems and Telecommunication for the Government of Switzerland; David Jacoby, President of Boston Strategies International; and Jorge A. Morales, former RFID technology advisor to the Mexican Government.

=== DDMRP - Demand Driven Planner Certification ===
In 2012 ISCEA partnered with the Demand Driven Institute (DDI) to offer the Certified Demand Driven Planner (CDDP) programme. The CDDP programme certifies professionals' knowledge on Demand Driven Material Requirements Planning (DDMRP). The partnership between ISCEA and DDI ended in 2018 when DDI launched its own DDMRP certification programme. ISCEA continues to offer CDDP training and certification.

=== SCTECH - Supply Chain Technology Conference and Expo ===
Since 2016 ISCEA has sponsored and managed a supply chain technology conference and expo named SCTECH. Besides being a Supply Chain, Operations, Engineering and Technology professionals gathering, SCTECH provides Professional Development Units (PDUs) to ISCEA's certified professional so that they can renew their certification credentials. The event has an itinerant nature. Its first edition was held in Chicago and following editions were held in Mexico and Paris.

Since 2023, SCTECH has offered a Virtual Program with global outreach, along with an In-Person Executive Program for Supply Chain Leaders. The Executive Programs for both the 2023 and 2024 editions took place at SAP’s World Headquarters in Walldorf, Germany.

=== Supply Chain Events Accreditation ===
Besides SCTECH, ISCEA has provided other Supply Chain Related Events with accreditation. Therefore, certified Supply Chain Professionals have been able to obtain PDUs for participating in those events and later applying for the Certificate of Participation.

=== Supply Chain Magazines ===
In September 2022, ISCEA Indonesia released Supply Chain Insights, a virtual magazine intended to share information and knowledge among Indonesian supply chain professionals.

In April 2024, the Global "Sustainable Supply Chain" Magazine was released with Ushasi Segupta as Editor in Chief and Madison DeSilva as Publisher.

In 2025, Dr. Mahmoud Mansi, an award-winning author of 9 books and Advisory Board Member at ISCEA, was appointed Editor in Chief of ISCEA's "Supply Chain Journal Middle East".

== International expansion ==
=== ISCEA Expansion into Latin America ===
In 2006 Seguro Popular, a governmental health-care institution created in 2002; issued an RFID technology mandate to authenticate and improve drug safety within its supply chain. ISCEA served as RFID technical advisor to the Mexican government providing guidance on best practices to implement RFID technology in Seguro Popular's Supply Chain Model, and also providing with RFID Supply Chain Manager (RFIDSCM) certification to Mexican Pharma Manufacturers and Distributors looking to comply with the mandate. Seguro Popular was later replaced by Insabi during the administration of President Andrés Manuel López Obrador, but ISCEA's presence has been expanding in Mexico and other Latin American countries ever since.

ISCEA has been active in the region through partnerships with Universities and Associations, delivering awards, participating in supply chain events and contributing with articles to supply chain media in Mexico, Colombia, Costa Rica, Ecuador, Panamá, Perú, and other countries.

In March 2023 ISCEA announced that for the next 5 years, scholarships with a total value of US$1,000,000 would be awarded in Latin America through the CSCA (Certified Supply Chain Analyst) program.

=== ISCEA Expansion into Europe, the Middle East and Africa ===
Since 2010 ISCEA has been organizing Supply Chain Management Summits and certification workshops in UAE and Saudi Arabia.

In 2014 the French Supply Chain Management Association (FAPICS), introduced to France ISCEA's CDDP (Certified Demand Driven Planner) certification program; and in 2016 it introduced CSCA (Certified Supply Chain Analyst). ISCEA's SCTECH 2019 was held in France in parallel to FAPICS Conference. In 2020, FAPICS changed its name to l'Association francophone de Supply Chain Management (AfrSCM), maintaining the collaboration and promoting ISCEA's certifications to schools like IAE Paris - Sorbonne Business School, and its member companies.

ISCEA collaborated in 2019 with Africa Resource Centre (ARC) awarding future leaders of Nigeria with Certified Supply Chain Analyst (CSCA) and Certified HealthCare Supply Chain Analyst (CHSCA) scholarships worth US$550,000. ARC is an independent supply chain advisor to Ministries of Health of African Countries, aimed to improve availability of medicine and health in Africa.

In 2021 ISCEA entered into a partnership with Supply Chain Economy-Management (SCE-Management). The focus of this partnership will be strengthening supply chain systems through both capacity building and certification in Benin and French-speaking Africa.

In 2025, the American University in Cairo - Onsi Sawiris School of Business Executive Education (ExecEd) secured ISCEA accreditation for its Supply Chain Management Professional Certificate. This recognition positioned AUC as the first university in Egypt to offer an ISCEA-accredited program that not only grants a professional certificate but also prepares participants to sit for the globally respected Certified Supply Chain Manager (CSCM) exam.

Other countries in EMEA in which supply chain professionals are acquiring their supply chain certification credentials from ISCEA include Iraq, Egypt, Jordan, Kenya, South Africa and Spain.

=== ISCEA Expansion into Asia-Pacific ===
ISCEA has been supporting supply chain education and providing with certification in the Asia-Pacific region since 2007. Some countries in APAC in which supply chain professionals are acquiring their supply chain certification credentials from ISCEA include India, Pakistan, Bangladesh Indonesia, Singapore and Sri Lanka.

ISCEA's Certified Lean Master (CLM) programme is delivered in Hong Kong and Malaysia through SGS, the global inspection, verification, testing and certification entity.

In 2019 Tim Charlton was appointed to the position of President of ISCEA-Pacific (Australia and New Zealand) and also appointed to the ISCEA- APAC Board that included Mr. Ejazur Rahman (Bangladesh) CEO, ISCEA-Asia, Mr. Nikhil Oswal (India), CEO, ISCEA-India, Dr. Premkumar Rajagopal (Malaysia), President, MUST (Malaysia University of Science and Technology), Mr. Sandeep Chatterjee (India), Senior Manager, Deloitte India, Dr. Nyoman Pujawan, Ph.D., (Indonesia), Professor, Institut Teknologi Sepuluh Nopember, and Dr. Harish Pant (India), Chief Business Transformation Officer, NTF (India) Pvt. Ltd.

In 2024, ISCEA started a partnership with Singapore-based SCALA - Supply Chain and Logistics Academy. SCALA (Singapore) and PPLC Superport & Industrial Co., LTD. (Cambodia) signed a historic Memorandum of Understanding (MoU) to train up to 300 Cambodian trainees in Singapore. The training included hands-on experiential learning and certification as Certified Supply Chain Analysts from ISCEA. The MoU signing was further marked at the Cambodia-Singapore Business Forum in the presence of Samdech Moha Borvor Thipadei Hun Manet, Prime Minister of the Kingdom of Cambodia.
