= Channel conflict =

Economic conflict resulting from disintermediation

Channel conflict is disagreement or competition among members of a marketing channel over goals, roles, resources, or other aspects of the distribution process. Because channel members are interdependent, the actions of one member can affect the ability of another to achieve its objectives. Channel conflict is studied in marketing and supply chain management, particularly in relation to the design and coordination of distribution channels.

Channel conflict can occur between firms at different levels of a distribution channel, between firms at the same level, or between different channels operated by the same firm. The increasing use of multiple distribution channels, including direct sales and e-commerce, has created additional opportunities for conflict because a manufacturer may simultaneously supply independent intermediaries and compete with them for customers.

== Types ==
Channel conflict is commonly classified according to the relationship between the parties involved.

=== Vertical conflict ===
Vertical channel conflict occurs between members operating at different levels of the same distribution channel, such as between a manufacturer and a wholesaler or between a wholesaler and a retailer. Conflict may arise when the parties disagree over pricing, responsibilities, territory, service requirements, or the allocation of customers and profits.

A common example is manufacturer encroachment, in which a manufacturer introduces a direct sales channel that competes with independent retailers or other intermediaries already selling the manufacturer's products. The growth of direct-to-consumer and Internet sales has made this form of conflict an important subject in the marketing-channel literature.

=== Horizontal conflict ===
Horizontal channel conflict occurs between channel members operating at the same level, such as between two retailers or two wholesalers. It can involve competition over customers, territories, prices, promotional activity, or other resources.

For example, two retailers carrying the same manufacturer's products may compete for the same customers by offering different prices or levels of service. Such competition can create disagreements when channel members perceive that another member's actions interfere with their ability to achieve their objectives.

=== Multichannel conflict ===
Multichannel conflict occurs when a firm uses multiple distribution channels that compete for the same customers or market. It is particularly associated with hybrid or multichannel distribution systems in which direct and indirect channels coexist.

An example is a manufacturer selling a product directly through its own website while also supplying independent retailers. The direct and indirect channels may then compete for customers, and differences in pricing, product availability, or service can affect the relationships between the manufacturer and its retail partners.

== Causes ==
Channel conflict can result from differences in the goals or expectations of channel members, disagreement over the roles and responsibilities of each member, and differences in perceptions of the market or of the behaviour of other members. The interdependence that characterizes distribution channels can increase the significance of such disagreements because the performance of one member affects the others.

Differences in economic interests can also generate conflict. Channel members may have different incentives concerning prices, margins, sales volumes, promotional activity, or investment in customer service. Power and dependence within the channel can further influence the behaviour of the parties and their ability to affect one another's decisions.

The introduction of a new channel can intensify these issues when the new channel overlaps with an existing channel's customers or activities. Research on manufacturer encroachment has consequently focused on how firms can introduce direct channels while managing their relationships with independent intermediaries.

== Effects and management ==
Channel conflict can affect the performance and relationships of the firms involved. A meta-analysis covering empirical studies from 1960 to 2020 found an overall negative association between channel conflict and channel performance, although the magnitude of the relationship varied with characteristics of the channel and the studies examined.

Channel management research therefore examines methods of coordinating channel members and aligning their incentives. Depending on the structure of the channel, these may include adjustments to wholesale or direct-channel prices, commissions, contracts, profit-sharing arrangements, differentiated responsibilities, or other mechanisms for coordinating the activities of channel members.

The relationship between channel multiplicity and conflict also remains an active area of research. A 2025 study of manufacturers in China found that increasing the number of channels was associated with higher levels of both horizontal and vertical conflict, while the effects differed according to how firms used interorganizational information systems and public social media.

== See also ==
- Distribution (marketing)
- Disintermediation
- Supply chain management
- Marketing channel
- Channel coordination
