= Erick Jones =

American engineering professor

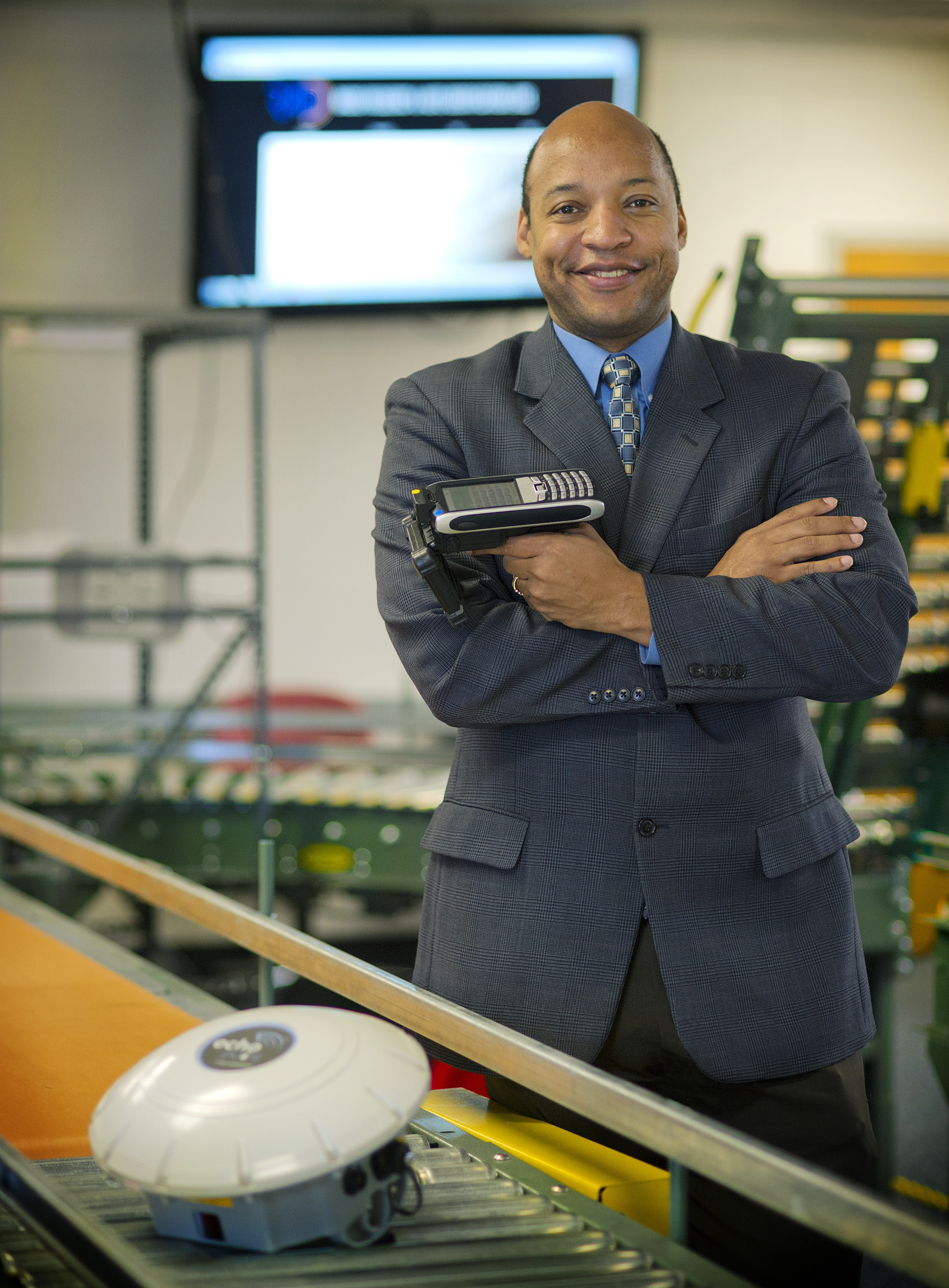
- Born: Houston, Texas, US
- Education: University of Houston; Texas A&M University
- Scientific career
- Fields: Industrial Engineer

Erick Christopher Jones Sr. is an industrial engineer and professor. He is an expert in radio-frequency identification (RFID), quality engineering, and Lean Six Sigma. Jones was the program director of The National Science Foundation's (NSF) Engineering Research Centers. He is currently Chair of the Supply Chain Technology Committee of International Supply Chain Education Alliance's (ISCEA) International Standards Board (IISB) and Editor in Chief of the International Supply Chain Technology Journal (ISCTJ).

Jones's background led him to be invited to the National Science Foundation as program officer for the largest engineering investment in the country, the Engineering Research Center (ERC). He also worked in the largest fellowship program in the country, the NSF's Graduate Research Fellowships Program (GRFP). Jones served as a rotating program director at the NSF.

== Education ==
Jones graduated from Texas A&M University with a bachelor's degree in industrial engineering in May 1993. He later earned a master's degree from University of Houston, where his thesis was "Turnover of Part-Time Hourly Employees in an Industrial Service Company" under the guidance of Dr. Christopher Chung in May 1996. He further went on to obtain a PhD in industrial engineering from the University of Houston while concurrently working in the industry. Under the guidance of his advisor Chung, he worked on the topic "A Predictive SPC Model for Determining Cognitive Voluntary Turnover before Physical Departure" and successfully conferred the Ph.D. in August 2003.

== Industry background ==
He has held positions in industry that include Industrial Engineering Specialist, Director of Engineering, Consultant and Project Manager, and Executive Manager of a "Big 5" Accounting firm, and executive manager for United Parcel Service (UPS), Tompkins Associates, Academy Sports and Outdoors, and Arthur Andersen. He managed teams and operations as small as 3 people and as large as 500 people. ISCEA announced that Dr. Erick C. Jones Sr., PhD., as President effective July 1, 2020.Dr. Jones will be inaugurated during the fall 2020 IISB Board of Directors Meeting.

== Research ==
Jones' research interests are mainly in the field of RFID and its applications and Lean Six Sigma. However, Jones's research also covers various other topics like supply-chain technology, logistics, operations research, engineering, training, transportation and healthcare. He has received external funding from agencies like the NSF NASA, TexasMRC and internal funding in support of his research pursuits. He has also worked with undergraduate, graduate students and other professors on different research projects under RAID LABS at The University of Texas at Arlington.The American Association for the Advancement of Science (AAAS) has named University of Texas at Arlington Professor Erick Jones Sr. as a fellow.

The AAAS recognized Jones, a professor in the Industrial, Manufacturing and Systems Engineering Department, “for distinguished contributions to the field of engineering, particularly for radio frequency identification (RFID), tracking, and lean six sigma contributions to manufacturing, logistics, health care, and public outreach.”

=== Development of RFID technologies ===
Jones has also been active in enriching the RFID technological toolkit with his focused research on RFID integration in cell phones and other automated monitoring systems, resulting in numerous potential new intellectual property developments. He is the former Editor in Chief of the International Supply Chain Technology Journal (ISCTJ).

=== Controversy ===
Jones has faced criticism for plagiarism and for the quality of his academic research. Papers that he published in the journal International Supply Chain Technology Journal, which he founded, have been described as “bizarre” and “incoherent.” In addition, he has been accused of plagiarism. In 2024, more than 100 students and faculty called for his resignation from the University of Nevada at Reno.

From 2022 to 2024 he was dean of the College of Engineering at UNR. In April 2024 the university appointed a different 'acting dean'.

== Books ==
He has also published over 241 transcripts, books and publications and has written, edited, and published dozens of peer-reviewed articles and conference papers. Some of his most notable books are RFID and Auto-ID in Planning and Logistics: A Practical Guide for Military UID Applications, RFID in Logistics: A Practical Introduction, and Quality Management for Organizations Using Lean Six Sigma Techniques.

- "RFID and Auto-ID in Planning and Logistics", E. C. Jones and Christopher A. Chung
- "Modern Quality for Organizations Using Lean Six Sigma Techniques", E. C. Jones.
- "RFID in Logistics:A Practical Introduction",. E. C. Jones and Christopher A. Chung.
- "Supply Chain Engineering and Logistics Handbook: Inventory and Production Control", E.C. Jones.

=== Industrial handbooks ===
- Tracked, What You Should Know About RFID, Internet of Things, Big Data and Data Security: The Official RFIDSCM Certification Handbook; Engineering Version by Jones, E. C., Gray, B., Wijemanne, M and Bolton, J,
- Tracked, What Everyone Should Know About Invisible Inventory, Monitoring and Tracking, The Official RFIDSCM Certification Handbook; Engineering Version by Jones, E. C., Gray, B and Armstrong, H.
- The Six Sigma Trap, What you should know about Six Sigma that your company is not telling you: The Official ISCEA CLSSYB Certification Book by Jones, E. C., and Armstrong, H.A.
- Clampitt, H.G., and Edited by E. C. Jones, “RFID Certification Textbook,” PWD Group, January 2006. Second Edition, May 2006, Third Edition, American RFID Solutions, Arlington Heights, IL, May 2007

== Leadership positions in international and national organizations ==
- Committee member, National Academics of Science, Engineering and Medicine (NASEM), "Potential Impacts of COVID – 19 on the Careers of Women in Science, Engineering and Medicine", August 18, 2020 – March 31, 2021
- President of ISCEA International Standards Board (IISB) – ISCEA, July 2020 – Present
- President, IISE Work Systems Division, July 2020 – Present
- Chairperson, Program - International Supply Chain Education Alliance RFID Supply Chain Manager (ISCEA RFID SCM) Certification Committee, 2007 – Present
- Board, Chief Diversity Equity and Inclusion Delegate (ASEE CDEI) - American Society of Engineering Educators, Engineering Economics Division, 2015 – 2023
- Program Chair, Division -American Society of Engineering Educators, Engineering Management Division, 2006 through 2007

== Fellowships ==
- National Academies of Science, Engineering, and Mathematics, Jefferson Science Fellow, 2021
- Sigma Xi, Fellow, June 2020
- Institute of Industrial and Systems Engineers, Fellow, May 2020
- African Scientific Institute (ASI), Notable Fellow, 2019
- International Supply Chain Education Alliance (ISCEA) Fellow, August 10, 2017
- William J. Fulbright Foundation Specialist Scholar, 2011
- Alfred P. Sloan Foundation, MPS Scholar, 2003

== Awards and honors ==
- The Academy of Medicine, Engineering, and Science of Texas (TAMEST) Protégé, 2020
- National Role Model Administrator Award, Minority Access Inc., 2018.
- George and Elizabeth Pickett Endowed Professor, University of Texas at Arlington, 2017.
- William J. Fulbright Scholar in Mexico 2013
- Fulbright Mexico Scholars Specialist, Engineering Education in Mexico, 2011.
- Innovative Use of Instructional Technology Teaching Award, 2007.
- College of Engineering Teaching Award Assistant Professor, 2007
- College of Engineering Service Award Assistant Professor, 2006.
- Omaha World Herald Featured article about RFID Lab, March 18, 2006.
- College of Engineering Research Award Assistant Professor, 2006.
- Alfred P. Sloan Underrepresented Minority Ph.D. Program Fellow, 2001.
- NACME Undergraduate Award, 1990, 1991, 1992.
- Presidential Achievement Award (Undergraduate), 1988–1992.
