= Charisma =

Charm that can inspire devotion in others

Charisma (/kəˈrɪzmə/) is a personal quality of magnetic charm, persuasion, or appeal.

In the fields of sociology and political science, psychology, and management, the term charismatic describes a type of leadership.

In Christian theology, the term charisma appears as the Spiritual gift (charism) which is an endowment with an extraordinary power given by the Holy Spirit.

== Etymology ==
The English word charisma derives from the Ancient Greek word χάρισμα (chárisma), which denotes a "favor freely given" and the "gift of grace". The singular term and the plural term χαρίσματα (charismata) both derive from the word χάρις (charis), meaning grace and charm. In religious praxis, the Ancient Greeks ascribed personality charisma to their pantheon of gods and goddesses, e.g. attributing charm, beauty, nature, creativity, and fertility to the individual Charites (Χάριτες). In theology and sociology, the denotations of the word charisma expanded from the Ancient Greek definition into the connotations of divinely-conferred charisma and of personality charisma, thus in A History of Charisma (2010), John Potts said that:

Contemporary charisma maintains, however, the irreducible character ascribed to it by [Max] Weber: it retains a mysterious, elusive quality. Media commentators regularly describe charisma as the X-factor. . . . The enigmatic character of charisma also suggests a connection — at least to some degree — to the earliest manifestations of charisma as a spiritual gift.

Moreover, the Koine Greek dialect spoken in Ancient Rome employed the terms charisma and charismata without the religious connotations.

== History ==
=== Divinely conferred charisma ===
The Hebrew Bible and the Christian Bible record the development of divinely conferred charisma. In the Hebrew text the idea of charismatic leadership is generally signaled by the use of the noun hen (favor) or the verb hanan (to show favor). The Greek term for charisma (grace or favor), and its root charis (grace) replaced the Hebrew terms in the Greek translation of the Hebrew Bible (the 3rd century BCE Septuagint). Throughout, "the paradigmatic image of the charismatic hero is the figure who has received God's favor". In other words, divinely conferred charisma applied to highly revered figures.

Thus, Eastern Mediterranean Jews in the 1st century CE had notions of charis and charisma that embraced the range of meanings found in Greek culture and the spiritual meanings from the Hebrew Bible. From this linguistic legacy of fused cultures, in 1 Corinthians, Paul the Apostle introduced the meaning that the Holy Spirit bestowed charism and charismata, "the gift of God's grace," upon individuals or groups. For Paul, "[t]here is a clear distinction between charisma and charis; charisma is the direct result of divine charis or grace."

In the New Testament Epistles, Paul refers to charisma or its plural charismata seven times in 1 Corinthians, written in Koine (or common) Greek around 54 CE. He elaborates on his concepts with six references in Romans (c. 56). He makes three individual references in 2 Corinthians 56, 1 Timothy, and 2 Timothy 62–67. The seventeenth and only other mention of charisma is in 1 Peter.

The gospels, written in the late first century, apply divinely conferred charisma to revered figures. Examples are accounts of Jesus' baptism and of his transfiguration, in which disciples see him as radiant with light, appearing together with Moses and Elijah. Another example is Gabriel's greeting to Mary as "full of grace". In these and other instances early Christians designated certain individuals as possessing "spiritual gifts", and these gifts included "the ability to penetrate the neighbour to the bottom of his heart and spirit and to recognize whether he is dominated by a good or by an evil spirit and the gift to help him to freedom from his demon".

Believers characterized their revered religious figures as having "a higher perfection… a special Charisma". Then, with the establishment of the Christian Church, "the old charismatic gifts and free offerings were transformed into a hierarchical sacerdotal system". The focus on the institution rather than divinely inspired individuals increasingly dominated religious thought and life, and that focus went unchanged for centuries.

In the 17th century church leaders, notably in the Latin tradition, accented "individual gifts [and] particular talents imparted by God or the Holy Spirit." The 19th century brought a shift in emphasis toward individual and spiritual aspects of charisma; Protestant and some Catholic theologians narrowed the concept to superlative, out-of-the-ordinary, and virtuoso gifts. Simultaneously, the term became alienated from the much wider meaning that early Christians had attached to it. Still, the narrowed term projected back to the earlier period "A systematically reflected and highly differentiated understanding of charisma was often unconsciously infused into the Scriptures and writings of the church fathers, so that these texts were no longer read through the eyes of the authors".

These dialectic meanings influenced changes in Pentecostalism in the late 19th century, and charismatic movements in some mainline churches in the mid-20th century. The discussion in the 21st Century Religion section explores what charisma means in these and other religious groups.

=== Personality charisma ===
The basis for modern secular usage comes from German sociologist Max Weber. He discovered the term in the work of Rudolph Sohm, a German church historian whose 1892 Kirchenrecht was immediately recognized in Germany as an epoch-making work. It also stimulated a debate between Sohm and leading theologians and religion scholars, which lasted more than twenty years and stimulated a rich polemical literature. That debate and literature had made charisma a popular term when Weber used it in The Protestant Ethic and the Spirit of Capitalism and in his Sociology of Religion. Perhaps because he assumed that readers already understood the idea, Weber's early writings lacked definition or explanation of the concept. In the collection of his works, Economy and Society, he identified the term as a prime example of action he labeled "value-rational," in distinction from and opposition to action he labeled "Instrumentally rational." Because he applied meanings for charisma similar to Sohm, who had affirmed the purely charismatic nature of early Christianity, Weber's charisma would have coincided with the divinely conferred charisma sense defined above in Sohm's work.

Weber introduced the personality charisma sense when he applied charisma to designate a form of authority. To explain charismatic authority, he developed his classic definition:

Charisma is a certain quality of an individual personality by virtue of which he is set apart from ordinary men and treated as endowed with supernatural, superhuman, or at least specifically exceptional powers or qualities. These as such are not accessible to the ordinary person, but are regarded as of divine origin or as exemplary, and on the basis of them the individual concerned is treated as a leader.

Here Weber extends the concept of charisma beyond supernatural to superhuman and even to exceptional powers and qualities. Sociologist Paul Joosse examined Weber's famous definition, and found that:

through simple yet profoundly consequential phrases such as "are considered" and "is treated", charisma becomes a relational, attributable, and at last a properly sociological concept.... For Weber, the locus of power is in the led, who actively (if perhaps unconsciously) invest their leaders with social authority.

In other words, Weber indicates that it is followers who attribute powers to the individual, emphasizing that "the recognition on the part of those subject to authority" is decisive for the validity of charisma.

Weber died in 1920, leaving "disordered, fragmentary manuscripts without even the guidance of a plan or table of the proposed contents". One unfinished manuscript contained his above quoted definition of charisma. It took over a quarter century for his work to be translated into English. With regard to charisma, Weber's formulations are generally regarded as having revived the concept from its deep theological obscurity. However, even with the admirable translations and prefaces of his entire works, many scholars have found Weber's formulations ambiguous. For the past half-century they have debated the meaning of many Weberian concepts, including the meaning of charisma, the role of followers, and the degree of a supernatural component.

== Modern perspectives ==
More recent research has investigated specific behavior patterns that can lead observers to perceive charisma. Through studies of audio and video recordings of people considered charismatic and not, and through experiments, it has become clear that posture, gestures, and prosodic behaviors play important roles. Moreover, some of these behaviors can be taught.

== See also ==
- Charis (name)
- Charismatic species – Large animals with popular appeal
- Instrumental and value-rational action – Philosophical terms
- Rizz (slang) – Internet slang word for charisma
- Political legitimacy – Right and acceptance of an authority
- Referent power – Power of a charismatic leader
- Superficial charm – Flattery, telling people what they want to hear
- Trait leadership – Patterns of personal characteristics that foster consistent leader effectiveness
