= Supply chain management =

Management of the flow of goods and services

Supply chain management field of operations: complex and dynamic supply and demand networks (cf. Wieland/Wallenburg, 2011)

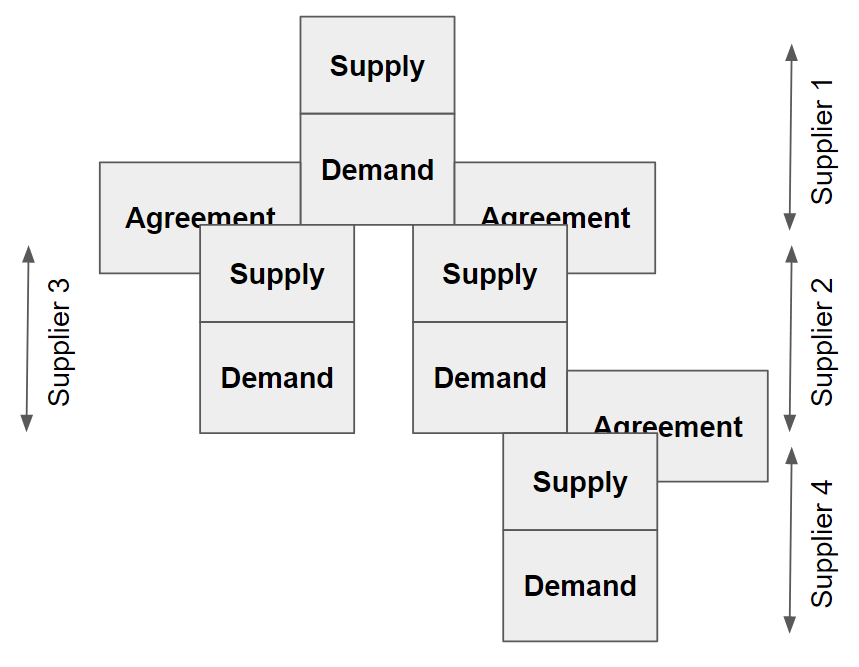
In an efficient supply chain, agreements are aligned.

In commerce, supply chain management (SCM) deals with a system of procurement (purchasing raw materials/components), operations management, logistics and marketing channels, through which raw materials can be developed into finished products and delivered to their end customers. A more narrow definition of supply chain management is the "design, planning, execution, control, and monitoring of supply chain activities with the objective of creating net value, building a competitive infrastructure, leveraging worldwide logistics, synchronising supply with demand and measuring performance globally". This can include the movement and storage of raw materials, work-in-process inventory, finished goods, and end-to-end order fulfilment from the point of origin to the point of consumption. Interconnected, interrelated or interlinked networks, channels and node businesses combine in the provision of products and services required by end customers in a supply chain.

SCM is the broad range of activities required to plan, control and execute a product's flow from materials to production to distribution in the most economical way possible. SCM encompasses the integrated planning and execution of processes required to optimize the flow of materials, information and capital in functions that broadly include demand planning, sourcing, production, inventory management and logistics—or storage and transportation.

Supply chain management strives for an integrated, multidisciplinary, multi-method approach. Research in supply chain management focuses on topics such as resilience, sustainability, and risk management, among others. Some suggest that the "people dimension" of SCM, ethical issues, internal integration, transparency/visibility, and human capital or talent management are topics that have been underrepresented on the research agenda.

Supply chain management, techniques with the aim of coordinating all parts of SC, from supplying raw materials to delivering and/or resumption of products, tries to minimize total costs with respect to existing conflicts among the chain partners. An example of these conflicts is the interrelation between the sale department desiring to have higher inventory levels to fulfill demands and the warehouse for which lower inventories are desired to reduce holding costs.

== Origin of the term and definitions ==
In 1982, Keith Oliver, a consultant at Booz Allen Hamilton, introduced the term "supply chain management" to the public domain in an interview for the Financial Times.

In the mid-1990s, the term "supply chain management" gained popularity when a flurry of articles and books came out on the subject. Supply chains were originally defined as encompassing all activities associated with the flow and transformation of goods from raw materials through to the end user or final consumer, as well as the associated information flows. Mentzer et al. consider it worthy of note that the final consumer was included within these early definitions. Supply chain management was then further defined as the integration of supply chain activities through improved supply chain relationships to achieve a competitive advantage.

In the late 1990s, "supply chain management" (SCM) rose to prominence, and operations managers began to use it in their titles with increasing regularity. A supply chain, as opposed to supply chain management, is a set of firms who move materials "forward", or a set of organizations, directly linked by one or more upstream and downstream flows of products, services, finances, or information from a source to a customer. Supply chain management is the management of such a chain.

Other commonly accepted definitions of supply chain management include:

- The management of upstream and downstream value-added flows of materials, final goods, and related information among suppliers, company, resellers, and final consumers.
- The systematic, strategic coordination of traditional business functions and tactics across all business functions within a particular company and across businesses within the supply chain, for the purposes of improving the long-term performance of the individual companies and the supply chain as a whole.
- A customer-focused definition is given by Hines (2004:p76): "Supply chain strategies require a total systems view of the links in the chain that work together efficiently to create customer satisfaction at the end point of delivery to the consumer. As a consequence, costs must be lowered throughout the chain by driving out unnecessary expenses, movements, and handling. The main focus is turned to efficiency and added value, or the end user's perception of value. Efficiency must be increased, and bottlenecks removed. The measurement of performance focuses on total system efficiency and the equitable monetary reward distribution to those within the supply chain. The supply chain system must be responsive to customer requirements."
- The integration of key business processes across the supply chain for the purpose of creating value for customers and stakeholders.
- According to the Council of Supply Chain Management Professionals (CSCMP), supply chain management encompasses the planning and management of all activities involved in sourcing, procurement, conversion, and logistics management. It also includes coordination and collaboration with channel partners, which may be suppliers, intermediaries, third-party service providers, or customers. Supply chain management integrates supply and demand management within and across companies. More recently, the loosely coupled, self-organizing network of businesses that cooperate to provide product and service offerings has been called the Extended Enterprise.

Mentzer et al. make a further distinction between "supply chain management" and a "supply chain orientation". The latter term involves a recognition that a business strategy cannot be fulfilled without managing the activities of suppliers and customers upstream and downstream, whereas the former term is used for "the actual implementation of this orientation".

Supply chain visibility, in its origins, was concerned with knowledge of the location, production stage and expected delivery date of incoming products and materials, so that production could be planned, but the development of the term has enabled it to be used to plan orders using knowledge of potential supplies, and to track post-production processes as far as delivery to customers. The concept of a "supply chain control tower" reflects the "end-to-end visibility" provided by an air traffic control tower. Writing for Gartner, Ashutosh Gupta sees a "supply chain control tower" as a concept which combines the capacities of "people, process, data, organization and technology" to improve supply chain visibility, noting that the technology behind a system which draws together information from a number of sources should not be separated from the people and processes it supports in order to improve visibility.

The UK Government also uses the term "supply chain visibility" in conjunction with its mandate to ensure that potential suppliers have visibility into future supply opportunities. The government's action note on supply chain visibility covers obligations and appropriate contractual wording requiring prime suppliers to advertise sub-contracting opportunities and to report on their spend with small and medium-sized enterprises and voluntary/community organisations within their supply chains.

Supply chain management software includes tools or modules used to execute supply chain transactions, manage supplier relationships, and control associated business processes. The overall goal of the software is to improve supply chain performance by monitoring a company's supply chain network from end-to-end (suppliers, transporters, returns, warehouses, retailers, manufacturers, and customers).

In some cases, a supply chain includes the collection of goods after consumer use for recycling or the reverse logistics processes for returning faulty or unwanted products back to producers up the value chain.

== Functions ==
Supply chain management is a cross-functional approach that includes managing the movement of raw materials into an organization, certain aspects of the internal processing of materials into finished goods, and the movement of finished goods out of the organization and toward the end consumer. As organizations strive to focus on core competencies and become more flexible, they reduce ownership of raw materials sources and distribution channels. These functions are increasingly being outsourced to other firms that can perform the activities better or more cost effectively. The effect is to increase the number of organizations involved in satisfying customer demand, while reducing managerial control of daily logistics operations. Less control and more supply chain partners lead to the creation of the concept of supply chain management. Supply chain management is concerned with improving trust and collaboration among supply chain partners, thus improving inventory visibility and the velocity of inventory movement.

Organizations increasingly find that they must rely on effective supply chains, or networks, to compete in the global market and networked economy. In Peter Drucker's (1998) new management paradigms, this concept of business relationships extends beyond traditional enterprise boundaries and seeks to organize entire business processes throughout a value chain of multiple companies. According to Drucker, "the greatest change in corporate culture—and the way business is being conducted—may be the accelerated growth of relationships based not on ownership, but on partnership." This approach allows companies to leverage the strengths and capabilities of various partners to achieve greater efficiency and innovation, ultimately enhancing overall business performance.

In recent decades, globalization, outsourcing, and information technology have enabled many organizations, such as Dell and Hewlett-Packard, to successfully operate collaborative supply networks in which each specialized business partner focuses on only a few key strategic activities. This inter-organizational supply network can be acknowledged as a new form of organization. However, with the complicated interactions among the players, the network structure fits neither "market" nor "hierarchy" categories. It is not clear what kind of performance impacts different supply-network structures could have on firms, and little is known about the coordination conditions and trade-offs that may exist among the players. From a systems perspective, a complex network structure can be decomposed into individual component firms. Traditionally, companies in a supply network concentrate on the inputs and outputs of the processes, with little concern for the internal management working of other individual players. Therefore, the choice of an internal management control structure is known to impact local firm performance.

In the 21st century, changes in the business environment have contributed to the development of supply chain networks. First, as an outcome of globalization and the proliferation of multinational companies, joint ventures, strategic alliances, and business partnerships, significant success factors were identified, complementing the earlier "just-in-time", lean manufacturing, and agile manufacturing practices. Second, technological changes, particularly the dramatic fall in communication costs (a significant component of transaction costs), have led to changes in coordination among the members of the supply chain network.

Many researchers have recognized supply network structures as a new organizational form, using terms such as "Keiretsu", "Extended Enterprise", "virtual supply chain", "Global Production Network", and "Next Generation Manufacturing System". In general, such a structure can be defined as "a group of semi-independent organizations, each with their capabilities, which collaborate in ever-changing constellations to serve one or more markets in order to achieve some business goal specific to that collaboration".

Supply chain management is also important for organizational learning. Firms with geographically more extensive supply chains connecting diverse trading cliques tend to become more innovative and productive.

The security-management system for supply chains is described in ISO/IEC 28000 and ISO/IEC 28001 and related standards published jointly by the ISO and the IEC. Supply Chain Management draws heavily from the areas of operations management, logistics, procurement, and information technology, and strives for an integrated approach.

=== Supply chain risks ===
Supply chain management (SCM) has become more complex due to supply chain disruptions associated with supply chain risks. Many supply chains tend to break down and require considerable time to recover when major disruptions occur. Scholars have identified different types of supply chain risks and emphasized the importance of supply chain risk management (SCRM). Among these, environmental variables have been studied for several reasons and have been considered influential in the selection of appropriate organizational structures. Simangunsong and Hendry defined supply chain uncertainty as a problem faced by practicing managers and developed a theoretical framework for future research by adopting a broad perspective on supply chain uncertainty, including supply chain risk. Typical disruptions in SCM include environmental uncertainty, sudden events, demand fluctuations, and other factors. The environmental uncertainty framework was considered conceptual, while environmental uncertainty was associated with supply chain performance.

On the other hand, demand in almost every industrial sector appears to have become more erratic due to increasing market turbulence. Christopher and Lee identified external events, such as wars, strikes, and terrorist attacks, as factors contributing to market turbulence and uncertainty. One of the most significant sudden events in recent years has been the coronavirus disease 2019 (COVID-19) pandemic, which has affected nearly every sector. The importance of supply chain management proved crucial in the 2019-2020 fight against the coronavirus (COVID-19) pandemic that swept across the world. During the pandemic period, governments in countries which had in place effective domestic supply chain management had enough medical supplies to support their needs and enough to donate their surplus to front-line health workers in other jurisdictions. The devastating COVID-19 crisis in US has turned many sectors of the local economy upside down, including the country's storied logistics industry. Some organizations were able to quickly develop foreign supply chains in order to import much needed medical supplies.

Cross-border supply chains can increase political risk.

=== Supply chain resilience ===
An important element of SCM is supply chain resilience, defined as "the capacity of a supply chain to persist, adapt, or transform in the face of change". For a long time, the interpretation of resilience in the sense of engineering resilience (= robustness) prevailed in supply chain management, leading to the notion of persistence. A popular implementation of this idea is given by measuring the time-to-survive and the time-to-recover of the supply chain, allowing to identify weak points in the system. The APICS Certified Supply Chain Professional (CSCP) program emphasizes the importance of managing risks and enhancing resilience. According to APICS, in order to manage global interruptions and preserve operational continuity, a robust supply chain is vital.

More recently, the interpretations of resilience in the sense of ecological resilience and social–ecological resilience have led to the notions of adaptation and transformation, respectively. A supply chain is thus interpreted as a social-ecological system that, similar to an ecosystem (e.g. forest), is able to constantly adapt to external environmental conditions.

For example, these three components of resilience can be discussed for the 2021 Suez Canal obstruction, when a ship blocked the canal for several days. Persistence means to "bounce back"; in our example it is about removing the ship as quickly as possible to allow "normal" operations. Adaptation means to accept that the system has reached a "new normal" state and to act accordingly; here, this can be implemented by redirecting ships around the African cape or use alternative modes of transport. Finally, transformation means to question the assumptions of globalization, outsourcing and linear supply chains and to envision alternatives; in this example this could lead to local and circular supply chains that do not need global transportation routes any longer.

Public policy can increase the resilience of supply chains.

== Historical developments ==
Six major movements can be observed in the evolution of supply chain management studies: creation, integration, globalization, specialization phases one and two, and SCM 2.0.

=== Creation era ===
The term "supply chain management" was first coined by Keith Oliver in 1982. However, the concept of a supply chain in management was of great importance long before, in the early 20th century, especially with the creation of the assembly line. The characteristics of this era of supply chain management include the need for large-scale changes, re-engineering, downsizing driven by cost reduction programs, and widespread attention to Japanese management practices. However, the term became widely adopted after the publication of the seminal book Introduction to Supply Chain Management in 1999 by Robert B. Handfield and Ernest L. Nichols, Jr., which published over 25,000 copies and was translated into Japanese, Korean, Chinese, and Russian.

=== Integration era ===
This era of supply chain management studies was highlighted with the development of electronic data interchange (EDI) systems in the 1960s and developed through the 1990s by the introduction of enterprise resource planning (ERP) systems. This era has continued to develop into the 21st century with the expansion of Internet-based collaborative systems. This era of supply chain evolution is characterized by both increasing value-added and reducing costs through integration.

A supply chain can be classified as a stage 1, 2, or 3 network. In stage 1–type supply chain, systems such as production, storage, distribution, and material control are not linked and are independent of each other. In a stage 2 supply chain, these are integrated under one plan, and enterprise resource planning (ERP) is enabled. A stage 3 supply chain is one that achieves vertical integration with upstream suppliers and downstream customers. An example of this kind of supply chain is Tesco.

=== Globalization era ===
It is the third movement of supply chain management development, the globalization era, can be characterized by the attention given to global systems of supplier relationships and the expansion of supply chains beyond national boundaries and into other continents. Although the use of global sources in organizations' supply chains can be traced back several decades (e.g., in the oil industry), it was not until the late 1980s that a considerable number of organizations started to integrate global sources into their core business. This era is characterized by the globalization of supply chain management in organizations with the goal of increasing their competitive advantage, adding value, and reducing costs through global sourcing.

=== Specialization era (phase I): outsourced manufacturing and distribution ===
In the 1990s, companies began to focus on "core competencies" and specialization. They abandoned vertical integration, sold off non-core operations, and outsourced those functions to other companies. This changed management requirements, as the supply chain extended beyond the company walls and management was distributed across specialized supply chain partnerships.

This transition also refocused the fundamental perspectives of each organization. Original equipment manufacturers (OEMs) became brand owners that required visibility deep into their supply base. They had to control the entire supply chain from above, instead of from within. Contract manufacturers had to manage bills of material with different part-numbering schemes from multiple OEMs and support customer requests for work-in-process visibility and vendor-managed inventory (VMI).

The specialization model creates manufacturing and distribution networks composed of several individual supply chains specific to producers, suppliers, and customers that work together to design, manufacture, distribute, market, sell, and service a product. This set of partners may change according to a given market, region, or channel, resulting in a proliferation of trading partner environments, each with its own unique characteristics and demands.

=== Specialization era (phase II): supply chain management as a service ===
Specialization within the supply chain began in the 1980s with the inception of transportation brokerages, warehouse management (storage and inventory), and non-asset-based carriers, and has matured beyond transportation and logistics into aspects of supply planning, collaboration, execution, and performance management.

Market forces sometimes demand rapid changes from suppliers, logistics providers, locations, or customers in their role as components of supply chain networks. This variability has significant effects on supply chain infrastructure, from the foundation layers of establishing and managing electronic communication between trading partners to more complex requirements such as the configuration of processes and workflows that are essential to the management of the network itself.

Outsourced technology hosting for supply chain solutions debuted in the late 1990s and has taken root primarily in transportation and collaboration categories. This has progressed from the application service provider (ASP) model from roughly 1998 through 2003 to the on-demand model from approximately 2003 through 2006, to the software as a service (SaaS) model in focus today. For example, supply chain collaboration platforms connect multiple buyers and suppliers with financial institutions, enabling them to conduct automated supply chain finance transactions.

=== Supply chain management 2.0 (SCM 2.0) ===
Increasing volatility has characterized supply chains since around 2003, including significant turbulence around the 2008 financial crisis. Douglass in 2010 referred to an SCM management style known as "extreme supply chain management", which "recognizes the need for collective, rather than sequential, risk management and facilitates collaboration on a new scale that is necessary for survival".

== Components ==
=== Management components ===
Cohen and Roussel, who led the Supply Chain Innovation practice at consulting firm PRTM (now part of PWC) in the 2000s, refer to five "core disciplines" required for "top performance" in supply chain management:

- recognising a company's supply chain as a strategic asset
- an end-to-end approach to the supply chain
- design for performance
- building an appropriate collaboration model, and
- using metrics to drive business success.

SCM components are the third element of the four-square circulation framework. The level of integration and management of a business process link is a function of the number and level of components added to the link. Consequently, adding more management components or increasing the level of each component can increase the level of integration of the business process link.

Literature on business process reengineering, buyer-supplier relationships, and SCM suggests various possible components that should receive managerial attention when managing supply relationships. Lambert and Cooper (2000) identified the following components:

- Planning and control
- Work structure
- Organization structure
- Product flow facility structure
- Information flow facility structure
- Management methods
- Power and leadership structure
- Risk and reward structure
- Culture and attitude

However, a more careful examination of the existing literature leads to a more comprehensive understanding of what should be the key critical supply chain components, or "branches" of the previously identified supply chain business processes—that is, what kind of relationship the components may have that are related to suppliers and customers. Bowersox and Closs (1996) state that the emphasis on cooperation represents the synergism leading to the highest level of joint achievement. A primary-level channel participant is a business that is willing to participate in responsibility for inventory ownership or assume other financial risks, thus including primary level components. A secondary-level participant (specialized) is a business that participates in channel relationships by performing essential services for primary participants, including secondary level components, which support primary participants. Third-level channel participants and components that support primary-level channel participants and are the fundamental branches of secondary-level components may also be included.

Consequently, Lambert and Cooper's framework of supply chain components does not lead to any conclusion about what are the primary- or secondary-level (specialized) supply chain components, i.e. which supply chain components should be viewed as primary or secondary, how these components should be structured in order to achieve a more comprehensive supply chain structure, or how to examine the supply chain as an integrative one.

=== Power in supply chain management ===
Andrew Cox, Joe Sanderson and Glyn Watson argue that the power resources of buyers and suppliers should be analyzed in order to understand how a supply chain relationship operates. In some cases, a purchasing firm may exercise more power over its suppliers, in other cases, suppliers may have more power; yet again there will be cases where buyers and suppliers may be interdependent or may have no real power over each other. Cox, Sanderson and Watson have written extensively on the operation of power regimes within a supply chain context; they have described their work for themselves as "a new perspective on managing in supply chains and networks". Other studies of power in supply chain relationships have looked at drivers impacting on the potential integration of supply chains. A study by Michael Maloni and W. C. Benton in 1998 looked at whether potential asymmetries in inter-firm power within a supply chain could prevent the implementation of effective supply chain execution. Maloni and Benton note that until their research, "little power research" had been presented in the supply chain literature. Using French and Raven's typology of the sources of power in the context of the automotive industry, they aimed to analyse the effects of distinct power strategies on relationships between buyers and sellers, and upon supply chain performance and satisfaction. Their findings showed that:

- expert and referent power sources lent themselves to "significant positive effects" on supply chain relationships;
- reward power had a somewhat beneficial impact
- coercive and legal/legitimate power bases, which they describe as "completely mediated power strategies", led to "significant negative relationships".

They concluded that "prudent use of power" can be beneficial for both the power source and the power target.

=== Reverse supply chain ===
Reverse logistics is the process of managing the return of goods and may be considered as an aspect of "aftermarket customer services". Any time money is taken from a company's warranty reserve or service logistics budget, one can speak of a reverse logistics operation. Reverse logistics also includes the process of managing the return of goods from store, which the returned goods are sent back to warehouse and after that either warehouse scrap the goods or send them back to supplier for replacement depending on the warranty of the merchandise.

== Business-process integration ==
Successful SCM requires a change from managing individual functions to integrating activities into key supply chain processes. In an example scenario, a purchasing department places orders as its requirements become known. The marketing department, responding to customer demand, communicates with several distributors and retailers as it attempts to determine ways to satisfy this demand. Information shared between supply chain partners can only be fully leveraged through business process integration, e.g., using electronic data interchange.

Supply chain business process integration involves collaborative work between buyers and suppliers, joint product development, common systems, and shared information. According to Lambert and Cooper (2000), operating an integrated supply chain requires a continuous information flow. However, in many companies, management has concluded that optimizing product flows cannot be accomplished without implementing a process approach. The key supply chain processes as stated by Lambert (2004) are:

- Customer relationship management
- Customer service management
- Demand management
- Order fulfillment
- Manufacturing flow management
- Supplier relationship management
- Product development and commercialization
- Returns management

Much has been written about demand management. Best-in-class companies have similar characteristics, which include the following:

- Internal and external collaboration
- Initiatives to reduce lead time
- Tighter feedback from customer and market demand
- Customer-level forecasting

One could suggest other critical supply business processes that combine these processes stated by Lambert, such as:

Customer service management process
Customer relationship management concerns the relationship between an organization and its customers. Customer service is the source of customer information. It also provides the customer with real-time information on scheduling and product availability through interfaces with the company's production and distribution operations. Successful organizations use the following steps to build customer relationships:
- determine mutually satisfying goals for organization and customers
- establish and maintain customer rapport
- induce positive feelings in the organization and the customers

=== Business strategy integration ===
Effective business process integration in supply chain management requires not only continuous communication, but also strategic coordination across departments and partner companies. The main reason for this is that it can effectively improve agility. At the same time, this integration can help businesses respond quickly to changes in demand and improve customer satisfaction.

Inventory management
Inventory management is concerned with ensuring the right stock at the right levels, in the right place, at the right time and the right cost. Inventory management entails inventory planning and forecasting: forecasting helps planning inventory.

Procurement process
Strategic plans are drawn up with suppliers to support the manufacturing flow management process and the development of new products. In firms whose operations extend globally, sourcing may be managed on a global basis. The desired outcome is a relationship where both parties benefit and a reduction in the time required for the product's design and development. The purchasing function may also develop rapid communication systems, such as electronic data interchange (EDI) and internet linkage, to convey possible requirements more rapidly. Activities related to obtaining products and materials from outside suppliers involve resource planning, supply sourcing, negotiation, order placement, inbound transportation, storage, handling, and quality assurance, many of which include the responsibility to coordinate with suppliers on matters of scheduling, supply continuity (inventory), hedging, and research into new sources or programs. Procurement has recently been recognized as a core source of value, driven largely by the increasing trends to outsource products and services, and the changes in the global ecosystem requiring stronger relationships between buyers and sellers.

Product development and commercialization
Here, customers and suppliers must be integrated into the product development process in order to reduce the time to market. As product life cycles shorten, the appropriate products must be developed and successfully launched with ever-shorter time schedules in order for firms to remain competitive. According to Lambert and Cooper (2000), managers of the product development and commercialization process must:
1. coordinate with customer relationship management to identify customer-articulated needs;
2. select materials and suppliers in conjunction with procurement; and
3. develop production technology in manufacturing flow to manufacture and integrate into the best supply chain flow for the given combination of product and markets.

Integration of suppliers into the new product development process was shown to have a major impact on product target cost, quality, delivery, and market share. Tapping into suppliers as a source of innovation requires an extensive process characterized by development of technology sharing, but also involves managing intellectual property issues.

Manufacturing flow management process
The manufacturing process produces and supplies products to the distribution channels based on past forecasts. Manufacturing processes must be flexible in order to respond to market changes and must accommodate mass customization. Orders are processes operating on a just-in-time (JIT) basis in minimum lot sizes. Changes in the manufacturing flow process lead to shorter cycle times (cycle time compression), meaning improved responsiveness and efficiency in meeting customer demand. La Londe and Masters found in 1994 research that improved supply chain management and cycle time compression were complementary strategies adopted by forward-looking businesses in the United States. This process manages activities related to planning, scheduling, and supporting manufacturing operations, such as work-in-process storage, handling, transportation, and time phasing of components, inventory at manufacturing sites, and maximum flexibility in the coordination of geographical and final assemblies postponement of physical distribution operations.

Physical distribution
This concerns the movement of a finished product or service to customers. In physical distribution, the customer is the final destination of a marketing channel, and the availability of the product or service is a vital part of each channel participant's marketing effort. It is also through the physical distribution process that the time and space of customer service become an integral part of marketing. Thus it links a marketing channel with its customers (i.e., it links manufacturers, wholesalers, and retailers).

Fleet management
Fleet management is the function within supply chain management that is responsible for overseeing a company's fleet of vehicles. This includes not only trucks and vans but also other assets like ships, planes, and specialized machinery. The primary goals are to ensure the efficient and safe operation of these assets, manage maintenance schedules, and control costs, particularly fuel consumption.

Modern fleet management is a key component of fleet digitalization. It relies heavily on telematics and vehicle tracking systems to provide real-time data on vehicle location, driver behavior, and engine diagnostics. This telemetry data is used to optimize routes, schedule predictive maintenance, and enhance the overall visibility and control of the physical distribution network.

Outsourcing/partnerships
This includes not just the outsourcing of the procurement of materials and components, but also the outsourcing of services that traditionally have been provided in-house. The logic of this trend is that the company will increasingly focus on those activities in the value chain in which it has a distinctive advantage and outsource everything else. This movement has been particularly evident in logistics, where the provision of transport, storage, and inventory control is increasingly subcontracted to specialists or logistics partners. Also, managing and controlling this network of partners and suppliers requires a blend of central and local involvement: strategic decisions are taken centrally, while the monitoring and control of supplier performance and day-to-day liaison with logistics partners are best managed locally.

Performance measurement
Experts found a strong relationship from the largest arcs of supplier and customer integration to market share and profitability. Taking advantage of supplier capabilities and emphasizing a long-term supply chain perspective in customer relationships can both be correlated with a firm's performance. As logistics competency becomes a critical factor in creating and maintaining competitive advantage, measuring logistics performance becomes increasingly important, because the difference between profitable and unprofitable operations becomes narrower. A.T. Kearney Consultants (1985) noted that firms engaging in comprehensive performance measurement realized improvements in overall productivity. According to experts, internal measures are generally collected and analyzed by the firm, including cost, customer service, productivity, asset measurement, and quality. External performance is measured through customer perception measures and "best practice" benchmarking.

Warehousing management
To reduce a company's cost and expenses, warehousing management is concerned with storage, reducing manpower cost, dispatching authority with on time delivery, loading and unloading facilities with proper area, inventory management system etc.

Workflow management
Integrating suppliers and customers tightly into a workflow (or business process) and thereby achieving an efficient and effective supply chain is a key goal of workflow management.

== Theories ==
There are gaps in the literature on supply chain management studies at present. A few authors, such as Halldorsson et al., Ketchen and Hult (2006), and Lavassani et al. (2009), have tried to provide theoretical foundations for different areas related to supply chain by employing organizational theories, which may include the following:

- Resource-based view (RBV)
- Transaction cost analysis (TCA)
- Knowledge-based view (KBV)
- Strategic choice theory (SCT)
- Agency theory (AT)
- Channel coordination
- Institutional theory (InT)
- Systems theory (ST)
- Network perspective (NP)
- Materials logistics management (MLM)
- Just-in-time (JIT)
- Material requirements planning (MRP)
- Theory of constraints (TOC)
- Total quality management (TQM)
- Agile manufacturing
- Time-based competition (TBC)
- Quick response manufacturing (QRM)
- Customer relationship management (CRM)
- Requirements chain management (RCM)
- Dynamic Capabilities Theory
- Dynamic Management Theory
- Available-to-promise (ATP)
- Supply Chain Roadmap
- Optimal Positioning of the Delivery Window (OPDW)

However, the unit of analysis of most of these theories is not the supply chain but rather another system, such as the firm or the supplier-buyer relationship. Among the few exceptions is the relational view, which outlines a theory for considering dyads and networks of firms as a key unit of analysis for explaining superior individual firm performance (Dyer and Singh, 1998).

== Organization and governance ==
The management of supply chains involve a number of specific challenges regarding the organization of relationships among the different partners along the value chain. Formal and informal governance mechanisms are central elements in the management of supply chain. Particular combinations of governance mechanisms may impact the relational dynamics within the supply chain. The need for interdisciplinarity in SCM research has been pointed out by academics in the field.

== Supply chain centroids ==
In the study of supply chain management, the concept of centroids has become a useful economic consideration. In mathematics and physics, a centroid is the arithmetic mean position of all the points in a plane figure. For supply chain management, a centroid is a location with a high proportion of a country's population and a high proportion of its manufacturing, generally within 500 mi (805 km). In the US, two major supply chain centroids have been defined, one near Dayton, Ohio, and a second near Riverside, California.

The centroid near Dayton is particularly important because it is closest to the population center of the US and Canada. Dayton is within 500 miles of 60% of the US population and manufacturing capacity, as well as 60% of Canada's population. The region includes the interchange between I-70 and I-75, one of the busiest in the nation, with 154,000 vehicles passing through per day, of which 30–35% are trucks hauling goods. In addition, the I-75 corridor is home to the busiest north–south rail route east of the Mississippi River.

A supply chain is the network of all the individuals, organizations, resources, activities and technology involved in the creation and sale of a product. A supply chain encompasses everything from the delivery of source materials from the supplier to the manufacturer through to its eventual delivery to the end user. The supply chain segment involved with getting the finished product from the manufacturer to the consumer is known as the distribution channel.

=== Wal-Mart strategic sourcing approaches ===
In 2010, Wal-Mart announced a big change in its sourcing strategy. Initially, Wal-Mart relied on intermediaries in the sourcing process. It bought only 20% of its stock directly, but the rest were bought through the intermediaries. Therefore, the company came to realize that the presence of many intermediaries in the product sourcing was actually increasing the costs in the supply chain. To cut these costs, Wal-Mart decided to do away with intermediaries in the supply chain and started direct sourcing of its goods from the suppliers. Eduardo Castro-Wright, the then Vice President of Wal-Mart, set an ambitious goal of buying 80% of all Wal-Mart goods directly from the suppliers. Walmart started purchasing fruits and vegetables on a global scale, where it interacted directly with the suppliers of these goods. The company later engaged the suppliers of other goods, such as cloth and home electronics appliances, directly and eliminated the importing agents. The purchaser, in this case Wal-Mart, can easily direct the suppliers on how to manufacture certain products so that they can be acceptable to the consumers. Thus, Wal-Mart, through direct sourcing, manages to get the exact product quality as it expects, since it engages the suppliers in the producing of these products, hence quality consistency. Using agents in the sourcing process in most cases lead to inconsistency in the quality of the products, since the agent's source the products from different manufacturers that have varying qualities.

Wal-Mart managed to source directly 80% profit its stock; this has greatly eliminated the intermediaries and cut down the costs between 5-15%, as markups that are introduced by these middlemen in the supply chain are cut. This saves approximately $4–15 billion. This strategy of direct sourcing not only helped Wal-Mart in reducing the costs in the supply chain but also helped in the improvement of supply chain activities through boosting efficiency throughout the entire process. In other words, direct sourcing reduced the time that takes the company to source and stocks the products in its stock. The presence of the intermediaries elongated the time in the process of procurement, which sometimes led to delays in the supply of the commodities in the stores, thus, customers finding empty shelves. Wal-Mart adopted this strategy of sourcing through centralizing the entire process of procurement and sourcing by setting up four global merchandising points for general goods and clothing. The company instructed all the suppliers to bring their products to these central points that are located in different markets. The procurement team assesses the quality brought by the suppliers, buys the goods, and distributes them to various regional markets. The procurement and sourcing at centralized places helped the company to consolidate the suppliers.

The company has established four centralized points, including an office in Mexico City and Canada. Just a mere piloting test on combining the purchase of fresh apples across the United States, Mexico, and Canada led to the savings of about 10%. As a result, the company intended to increase centralization of its procurement in North America for all its fresh fruits and vegetables. Thus, centralization of the procurement process to various points where the suppliers would be meeting with the procurement team is the latest strategy which the company is implementing, and signs show that this strategy is going to cut costs and also improve the efficiency of the procurement process.

Strategic vendor partnerships is another strategy the company is using in the sourcing process. Wal-Mart realized that in order for it to ensure consistency in the quality of the products it offers to the consumers and also maintain a steady supply of goods in its stores at a lower cost, it had to create strategic vendor partnerships with the suppliers. Wal-Mart identified and selected the suppliers who met its demand and at the same time offered it the best prices for the goods. It then made a strategic relationship with these vendors by offering and assuring the long-term and high volume of purchases in exchange for the lowest possible prices. Thus, the company has managed to source its products from same suppliers as bulks, but at lower prices. This enables the company to offer competitive prices for its products in its stores, hence, maintaining a competitive advantage over its competitors whose goods are a more expensive in comparison.

Another sourcing strategy Wal-Mart uses is implementing efficient communication relationships with the vendor networks; this is necessary to improve the material flow. The company has all the contacts with the suppliers whom they communicate regularly and make dates on when the goods would be needed, so that the suppliers get ready to deliver the goods in time. The efficient communication between the company's procurement team and the inventory management team enables the company to source goods and fill its shelves on time, without causing delays and empty shelves. In other words, the company realized that in ensuring a steady flow of the goods into the store, the suppliers have to be informed early enough, so that they can act accordingly to avoid delays in the delivery of goods. Thus, efficient communication is another tool which Wal-Mart is using to make the supply chain be more efficient and to cut costs.

Cross-docking is another strategy that Wal-Mart is using to cut costs in its supply chain. Cross-docking is the process of transferring goods directly from inbound trucks to outbound trucks. When the trucks from the suppliers arrive at the distribution centers, most of the trucks are not offloaded to keep the goods in the distribution centers or warehouses; they are transferred directly to another truck designated to deliver goods to specific retail stores for sale. Cross-docking helps in saving the storage costs. Initially, the company was incurring considerable costs of storing the goods from the suppliers in its warehouses and the distributions centers to await the distribution trucks to the retail stores in various regions.

== Tax-efficient supply chain management ==
Tax-efficient supply chain management is a business model that considers the effect of tax in the design and implementation of supply chain management. As the consequence of globalization, cross-national businesses pay different tax rates in different countries. Due to these differences, they may legally optimize their supply chain and increase profits based on tax efficiency.

== Sustainability and social responsibility in supply chains ==
Supply chain networks are integral to an economy, but their health is dependent on the well-being of the environment and society. Supply chain sustainability is a business issue affecting an organization's supply chain or logistics network, and is frequently quantified by comparison with SECH ratings, which address social, ethical, cultural, and health footprints. These build on the triple bottom line incorporating economic, social, and environmental aspects. The more commonly used ESG terminology represents Environment, Social and Governance. Consumers have become more aware of the environmental impact of their purchases and companies' ratings and, along with non-governmental organizations (NGOs), are setting the agenda, and beginning to push for transitions to more sustainable approaches such as organically grown foods, anti-sweatshop labor codes, and locally produced goods that support independent and small businesses. Because supply chains may account for over 75% of a company's carbon footprint, many organizations are exploring ways to reduce this and thus improve their profile.

For example, in July 2009, Wal-Mart announced its intentions to create a global sustainability index that would rate products according to the environmental and social impacts of their manufacturing and distribution. The index is intended to create environmental accountability in Wal-Mart's supply chain and to provide motivation and infrastructure for other retail companies to do the same.

It has been reported that companies are increasingly taking environmental performance into account when selecting suppliers. A 2011 survey by the Carbon Trust found that 50% of multinationals expect to select their suppliers based upon carbon performance in the future and 29% of suppliers could lose their places on 'green supply chains' if they do not have adequate performance records on carbon.

In addition to environmental concerns, increased globalization within global supply chains challenges human rights and worker exploitation risks within multinational corporations including forced labor and modern slavery. Textiles, agriculture, and manufacturing are some of the industries with significant labor exploitation risks. There are many different methods governments, corporations, and NGOs use to prevent labor exploitation, including corporate social responsibility, export controls, import bans, and monitoring labor standards.

The US Dodd–Frank Wall Street Reform and Consumer Protection Act, signed into law by President Obama in July 2010, contained a supply chain sustainability provision in the form of the Conflict Minerals law. This law requires SEC-regulated companies to conduct third party audits of their supply chains in order to determine whether any tin, tantalum, tungsten, or gold (together referred to as conflict minerals) is mined or sourced from the Democratic Republic of the Congo, and create a report (available to the general public and SEC) detailing the due diligence efforts taken and the results of the audit. The chain of suppliers and vendors to these reporting companies will be expected to provide appropriate supporting information.

Incidents like the 2013 Savar building collapse, with more than 1,100 victims, have led to widespread discussions about corporate social responsibility across global supply chains. Wieland and Handfield (2013) suggest that companies need to audit products and suppliers and that supplier auditing needs to go beyond direct relationships with first-tier suppliers. They also demonstrate that visibility needs to be improved if supply cannot be directly controlled and that smart and electronic technologies play a key role to improve visibility. Finally, they highlight that collaboration with local partners, across the industry and with universities is crucial to successfully managing social responsibility in supply chains. Recent research proposes a two-phase approach for auditing multitier supply networks. Under this strategy, buyers first audit and drop noncompliant suppliers and then proceed to audit and rectify the remaining ones; when auditing an upper tier, the approach recommends selecting the "least valuable unaudited supplier" as the next candidate for auditing.

== Circular supply chain management ==
Circular supply chain management (CSCM) is "the configuration and coordination of the organizational functions marketing, sales, R&D, production, logistics, IT, finance, and customer service within and across business units and organizations to close, slow, intensify, narrow, and dematerialise material and energy loops to minimize resource input into and waste and emission leakage out of the system, improve its operative effectiveness and efficiency and generate competitive advantages". By reducing resource input and waste leakage along the supply chain and configuring it to enable the recirculation of resources at different stages of the product or service lifecycle, potential economic and environmental benefits can be achieved, for example a decrease in material and waste management cost, reduced emissions, and reduced resource consumption. Geissdoerfer et al. suggest that circular supply chain management "remains a rather unexplored area of research".

== Supply chain engineering ==
Although it has the same goals as supply chain engineering, supply chain management is focused on a more traditional management and business based approach, whereas supply chain engineering is focused on a mathematical model based one.

== Digitizing supply chains ==
Consultancies and media expect the performance efficacy of digitizing supply chains to be high. Additive manufacturing and blockchain technology have emerged as the two technologies with some of the highest economic relevance. A broader overview of digital supply chain technologies, including enterprise systems, warehouse and transportation management, IoT, robotics, digital twins, and artificial intelligence, is available.

Additive manufacturing
The potential of additive manufacturing is particularly high in the production of spare parts, since its introduction can reduce warehousing costs of slowly rotating spare parts. Digitizing technology bears the potential to completely disrupt and restructure supply chains and enhance existing production routes. For example, Cainiao has implemented a digital optimization system that selects fulfillment routes for parcels by coordinating logistics partners. The system uses mathematical optimization algorithms to assign parcels to delivery routes and has been applied to shipments from China to other countries and regions.

Blockchain
In comparison, research on the influence of blockchain technology on the supply chain is still in its early stages. The conceptual literature has argued for a considerably long time that the highest performance efficacy is expected in the potential for automatic contract creation. Empirical evidence contradicts this hypothesis: the highest potential is expected in the arenas of verified customer reviews and certifications of product quality and standards. In addition, traditional supply chain has many drawbacks such as lack of transparency and trust, and some of them can be solved by blockchain technology. The technological features of blockchains support transparency and traceability of information, as well as high levels of reliability and immutability of records. Companies such as OwlTing Group have implemented blockchain-based traceability systems for agricultural and food supply chains in Taiwan. That helps traditional supply chain management to be more efficient and reliable.

Internet of thing
Information technology applications in SCM are still in their early stages of development. Many scholars have emphasized the use of information technology (IT) in supply chain management (SCM). Zhong et al reviewed storage technology, data processing technology, data visualization techniques, big data analytics, and models and algorithms as the main technologies currently used. Ivanov et al examined the relationships between digitalization and supply chain (SC) disruption risks. The applications of radio-frequency identification (RFID) in supply chain management have also been discussed in various studies. However, the majority of existing theoretical models are based on comprehensive knowledge exchange and unrestricted information flow, whereas, in practice, information system operations may be inefficient due to technological barriers.

== Systems and value ==
Supply chain systems configure value for those that organize the networks. Value is the additional revenue over and above the costs of building the network. Co-creating value and sharing the benefits appropriately to encourage effective participation is a key challenge for any supply system. Tony Hines defines value as follows: "Ultimately it is the customer who pays the price for service delivered that confirms value and not the producer who simply adds cost until that point".

== Global applications ==
Global supply chains pose challenges regarding both quantity and value. Supply and value chain trends include:

- Globalization
- Increased cross-border sourcing
- Collaboration for parts of value chain with low-cost providers
- Shared service centers for logistical and administrative functions
- Increasingly global operations, which require increasingly global coordination and planning to achieve global optimums
- Complex problems involve also midsized companies to an increasing degree

These trends have many benefits for manufacturers because they make possible larger lot sizes, lower taxes, and better environments (e.g., culture, infrastructure, special tax zones, or sophisticated OEM) for their products. There are many additional challenges when the scope of supply chains is global. This is because with a supply chain of a larger scope, the lead time is much longer, and because there are more issues involved, such as multiple currencies, policies, and laws. The consequent problems include different currencies and valuations in different countries, different tax laws, different trading protocols, vulnerability to natural disasters and cyber threats, and lack of transparency of cost and profit.

== Effects of trade policy reforms on supply chains (2024-2025) ==
The disruptions in the existing international supply chain networks created by tariff increases in 2024-2025 were quantifiable. Shipping lines recorded large changes in cargo tonnage and trade routes when manufacturers reviewed the economic feasibility of marketed trade routes.

According to German shipping company Hapag-Lloyd, one in every three of the planned U.S.-bound shipments in China had been cancelled as a result of tariff announcements. These cancellations were one of the more drastic instances of instant supply chain change, providing unused capacity on trans-Pacific paths, and at the same time, placing additional stress on companies to find alternative sourcing deals. The extent of disruption depended on the sector of the industry, and the most impacted was the labor-intensive manufacturing.

Government officials had economic evaluations that pointed to other wider consequences than direct trade expenses. The Finance Minister of Indonesia estimated that disruptions related to tariffs would decrease the GDP of the country by 0.3 to 0.5 percentage points. These projections represented fears of second-hand effects, such as reduced investment in business and slowed infrastructure development in export-related sectors. The countries that had high manufacturing export bases were under special pressure to diversify access to markets.

Not every economy had suffered equal adverse effects from the tariff environment. The increase of Mexican manufacturing exports to the United States was about 9 percent between January and November 2025. However, automotive shipments were subject to special duties, whereas the non-automotive manufactured commodities showed better performance with 17% increase over the same period of time. This was apparently a result of the reorientation of the supply chain, where production operations moved to areas where preferential trade status was being sustained by the jurisdictions. Some of the observers were surprised by the pace of such reconfigurations, and this indicated that the supply chain was more flexible than was earlier thought.

Corporate adaptation practices were not just limited to mere geographical relocation. The documented responses were the reorganization of procurement networks, changes in the import process to streamline the tariff classification, and speedy sourcing activities in the region. Some multinational companies developed parallel sourcing capacity in two or more locations - a back-up to maintain the flexibility of operations in the face of policy vagaries. The economic implications of having duplicate supply chains made the long-term sustainability of such methods questionable.

These changes took place in compressed periods as compared to the conventional redesign of supply chains. Whereas major network restructuring normally takes several years to be implemented, tariff-based changes often need to be put in place within quarters. This speed challenged organizational agility to change and identified supply chain agility as a more and more important strategic ability. It was still a debatable issue whether those changes would continue to exist once the possible cut on tariffs would occur after all.

== Roles and responsibilities ==
Supply chain professionals play major roles in the design and management of supply chains. In the design of supply chains, they help determine whether a product or service is provided by the firm itself (insourcing) or by another firm elsewhere (outsourcing). In the management of supply chains, supply chain professionals coordinate production among multiple providers, ensuring that production and transport of goods happen with minimal quality control or inventory problems. One goal of a well-designed and maintained supply chain for a product is to successfully build the product at minimal cost. Such a supply chain could be considered a competitive advantage for a firm.

Beyond design and maintenance of a supply chain itself, supply chain professionals participate in aspects of business that have a bearing on supply chains, such as sales forecasting, quality management, strategy development, customer service, and systems analysis. Production of a good may evolve over time, rendering an existing supply chain design obsolete. Supply chain professionals need to be aware of changes in production and business climate that affect supply chains and create alternative supply chains as the need arises.

In a research project undertaken by Michigan State University's Broad College of Business, with input from 50 participating organizations, the main issues of concern to supply chain managers were identified as capacity/resource availability, talent (recruitment), complexity, threats/challenges (supply chain risks), compliance and cost/purchasing issues. Keeping up with frequent changes in regulation was identified as a particular concern. Complexity within supply chains has also been highlighted in Supply Chain Digest and by Gartner as a perennial challenge.

Supply chain consultants may provide expert knowledge in order to assess the productivity of a supply chain and, ideally, to enhance its productivity. Supply chain consulting involves the transfer of knowledge on how to exploit existing assets through improved coordination and can hence be a source of competitive advantage: the role of the consultant is to help management by adding value to the whole process through the various sectors from the ordering of the raw materials to the final product. In this regard, firms may either build internal teams of consultants to tackle the issue or engage external ones: companies choose between these two approaches taking into consideration various factors.

The use of external consultants is a common practice among companies. The whole consulting process generally involves the analysis of the entire supply chain process, including the countermeasures or correctives to take to achieve a better overall performance.

== Skills and competencies ==
Supply chain professionals need to have knowledge of managing supply chain functions such as transportation, warehousing, inventory management, and production planning. In the past, supply chain professionals emphasized logistics skills, such as knowledge of shipping routes, familiarity with warehousing equipment and distribution center locations and footprints, and a solid grasp of freight rates and fuel costs. More recently, supply chain management extends to logistical support across firms and management of global supply chains. Supply chain professionals need to have an understanding of business continuity basics and strategies, and Tramarico et al noted that several processes from other disciplinary theories, including the resource-based view, supply chain design and interorganizational relationships are integral to a mature understanding of supply chain management. A shortage of skilled supply chain professionals was highlighted in a study by the Massachusetts Institute of Technology published in 2010, which highlighted plentiful supply of staff with "narrow technical skillsets" but shortages in the numbers of job applicants with "broader business skills".

=== Certification ===
Individuals working in supply chain management can attain professional certification by passing an exam developed by a third party certification organization. The purpose of certification is to guarantee a certain level of expertise in the field. The knowledge needed to pass a certification exam may be gained from several sources. Some knowledge may come from college courses, but most of it is acquired from a mix of on-the-job learning experiences, attending industry events, learning best practices with their peers, and reading books and articles in the field. Certification organizations may provide certification workshops tailored to their exams.

=== University rankings ===
The following North American universities rank high in their master's education in the SCM World University 100 ranking, which was published in 2017 and which is based on the opinions of supply chain managers: Michigan State University, Penn State University, University of Tennessee, Massachusetts Institute of Technology, Arizona State University, University of Texas at Austin and Western Michigan University. In the same ranking, the following European universities rank high: Cranfield School of Management, Vlerick Business School, INSEAD, Cambridge University, Eindhoven University of Technology, London Business School and Copenhagen Business School.

The following universities rank high in the 2016 Eduniversal Best Masters ranking for supply chain and logistics: Massachusetts Institute of Technology, KEDGE Business School, Purdue University, Rotterdam School of Management, Pontificia Universidad Catolica del Peru, Universidade Nova de Lisboa, Vienna University of Economics and Business and Copenhagen Business School.

=== Organizations ===
A number of organizations provide certification in supply chain management, such as the Council of Supply Chain Management Professionals (CSCMP), IIPMR (International Institute for Procurement and Market Research), APICS (the Association for Operations Management), ISCEA (International Supply Chain Education Alliance) and IoSCM (Institute of Supply Chain Management). APICS' certification is called Certified Supply Chain Professional, or CSCP, and ISCEA's certification is called the Certified Supply Chain Manager (CSCM), CISCM (Chartered Institute of Supply Chain Management) awards certificate as Chartered Supply Chain Management Professional (CSCMP). Another, the Institute for Supply Management, is developing one called the Certified Professional in Supply Management (CPSM) focused on the procurement and sourcing areas of supply chain management. The Supply Chain Management Association (SCMA) is the main certifying body for Canada with the designations having global reciprocity. The designation Supply Chain Management Professional (SCMP) is the title of the supply chain leadership designation.

== See also ==
- Beer distribution game
- Demand-chain management
- Military supply chain management
- second source
- Supply chain diversification
