= Conference Board Leading Economic Index =

Index intended to forecast economic activity

The Conference Board Leading Economic Index is an American economic leading indicator intended to forecast future economic activity. It is calculated by The Conference Board, a non-governmental organization, which determines the value of the index from the values of ten key variables. These variables have historically turned downward before a recession and upward before an expansion. The per cent change year over year of the Leading Economic Index is a lagging indicator of the market directions.

A Federal Reserve Bank of New York report What Predicts U.S. Recessions? uses each component of the Conference Board's Leading Economic Index. That report said that the indicators signal peaks and troughs in the business cycle, and the aggregate index has been shown to drop ahead of recessions and rise before expansions.

Revisions to The Conference Board Leading Economic Index effective with the January 26, 2012 release began using the new Leading Credit Index ... etc.

- The United States Department of Labor’s monthly report on the unemployment rate, average hourly earnings and the average workweek hours from the Employment Situation report
- The United States Department of Labor’s weekly report on first-time claims for state unemployment insurance
- The United States Census Bureau’s monthly consumer goods and materials report from the Preliminary Report on Manufacturers' Shipments, Inventories, and Orders
- The United States Census Bureau’s monthly non-defense capital goods report from the Preliminary Report on Manufacturers' Shipments, Inventories, and Orders
- The United States Census Bureau’s monthly report on building permits from the Housing Starts and Building Permits report
- The difference (spread) between the interest rates of 10-year United States Treasury notes and the federal funds rate
- The Conference Board's Leading Credit Index, itself a composite index of six financial indicators, e.g. yield spreads and investor sentiment
- The Institute for Supply Management’s monthly ISM Index of Manufacturing including: supplier deliveries, imports, production, inventories, new orders, new export orders, order backlogs, prices and employment.
- The S&P 500
- The University of Michigan Consumer Sentiment Index's consumer expectations

== See also ==
- Economic indicator
