= ISM Report On Business =

Economic report issued by the Institute for Supply Management

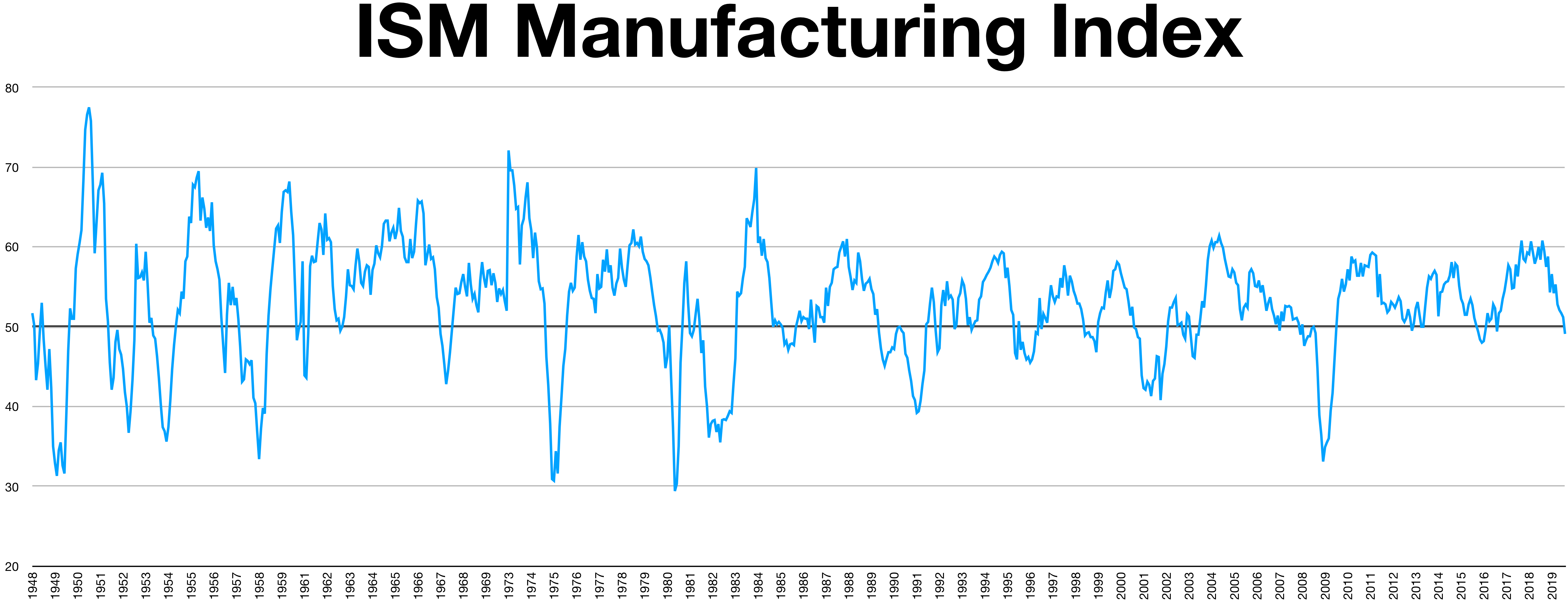
ISM Manufacturing index

The ISM® PMI® Reports, also known as ISM Report On Business, ROB or the ISM Report, is the collective name for two monthly United States statistical business reports, the Manufacturing PMI and the Services PMI (formerly Non-Manufacturing), published by US Institute for Supply Management. The PMI Reports are based on a national survey of purchasing and supply chain professionals tracking changes in the manufacturing and services sectors. It is considered to be one of the most reliable economic barometers of the U.S. economy and gives an important early look at the health of the nation's economy. In addition to being market moving, the PMI Reports makes an important contribution to the American statistical system and to economic policy. It also has one of the shortest reporting lags of any macroeconomic series.

== History ==
The origin of the Manufacturing ISM Report On Business can be traced back to 1923. The ISM, then known as the National Association of Purchasing Agents (N.A.P.A.), began to survey its members and share the results with them. Three years later, N.A.P.A. selected Edward T. Gushee, a purchaser from Detroit, Michigan, to supervise the organization's survey group and expand the information they gathered.

In 1930, U.S. President Herbert Hoover sought information that could help resolve the economic difficulties of the Great Depression. With President Hoover's support, the U.S. Chamber of Commerce organized a committee to gather pertinent business data from companies that were members of the Chamber. However, after many attempts efforts to gather this information, the committee disbanded in June 1931.

Both John R. Whitehead, the newly elected president of N.A.P.A. who represented the association on this committee, and George A. Renard, N.A.P.A's executive secretary, wanted to continue the committee's work. They believed a survey would support the country's economy and help purchasing professionals. Under their leadership, the newly founded Business Survey Committee surveyed the association's membership on business conditions. Renard tabulated the results and sent them to President Hoover.

The positive feedback from N.A.P.A. members and the government led N.A.P.A. to continue to survey its members. Other than for a four-year interruption during World War II, ISM (and its predecessors) have published the report since 1931.

== Manufacturing PMI ==
While the ISM has published the manufacturing report since 1931, in the early 1980s, the U.S. Department of Commerce (DOC) and ISM developed the Purchasing Managers' Index (PMI). The index, based on analytical work by the DOC, adjusts four of the five components of ISM's monthly survey — new orders, production, employment, supplier and deliveries — for normal seasonal variations, adds in inventories, applies equal weights to each and then calculates a single monthly index number.

An update of research performed by Theodore S. Torda, a DOC economist, shows a close parallel between growth in real Gross Domestic Product (GDP) and the PMI. The index can explain about 60 percent of the annual variation in GDP, with a margin of error that averaged ± .48 percent during the last ten years. George McKittrick, a former DOC economist said "Not only does the PMI track well with the overall economy, but the indication provided by ISM data about how widespread changes are, complements analogous government series that show size and direction of change."

In January 1989, the Supplier Deliveries Index from the Report became a standard element of the DOC's Bureau of Economic Analysis Index of Leading Economic Indicators. The data was incorporated into the index from June 1976 forward. In January 1996, The Conference Board began to compile this index.

== Services PMI (formerly Non-Manufacturing) ==
The origin of the Services PMI can be traced to 1996. Over the years, there had been a shift in ISM's membership from nearly 100 percent manufacturing firms in the 1930s to almost 50 percent services firms by 1996 such as:

- Financial services
- Health services
- Transportation
- Communication
- Public administration

Also, by this time, the services sector of the U.S. economy was responsible for about 80 percent of gross domestic product (GDP), the primary measure of economic activity. There also was a trend toward the services share of the economy continuing to increase in the future. While the existing ISM Manufacturing Report On Business was well-accepted as one of the primary indicators of overall U.S. economic activity, ISM felt that to fully capture all economic activity and to enable all members of ISM to participate in the survey, a services version of the Report On Business should be considered. As a result, in 1996, it formed a committee to explore the development of the Services ISM Report On Business. By the spring of 1997 the pilot was considered successful. In July of that year, routine monthly data collection began.

Monthly public reporting and release of data debuted in June 1998 with the release of the May 1998 data and ten months of data history. The Services PMI is released on the third business day of each month, and is based on data compiled from monthly surveys sent to purchasing executives working in the services industries across the country. The process, content and format of the report parallel that of the manufacturing report with only a few differences. Each month, the survey responses reflect change, if any, in the current month's report compared to the previous month. The report covers:

- Services Index
- Business Activity
- New Orders
- Backlog of Orders
- New Export Orders
- Inventory Change
- Inventory Sentiment
- Imports
- Prices
- Employment
- Supplier Deliveries

The Services Index which is a weighted composite index for services data (similar to the Purchasing Managers' Index (PMI)) was developed and first published in the January 2008 Non-Manufacturing ISM Report On Business. This was not available prior to that date because there was insufficient services historical data to develop a composite index.

== Methodology ==
All the ISM indexes are diffusion indexes and are indicators of month-to-month change. The percent response to the "Better," "Same," or "Worse" question is difficult to compare to prior periods; therefore, ISM diffuses the percentages for this purpose. A diffusion index indicates the degree to which the indicated change is dispersed or diffused throughout the sample population. Respondents to ISM surveys indicate each month whether particular activities (e.g., new orders) for their organizations have increased, decreased, or remained unchanged from the previous month.

The ISM indexes are calculated by taking the percentage of respondents that report that the activity has increased ("Better") and adding it to one-half of the percentage that report the activity has not changed ("Same") and adding the two percentages. Using half of the "Same" percentage effectively measures the bias toward a positive (above 50 percent) or negative index. As an example of calculating a diffusion index, if the response is 20 percent "Better," 70 percent "Same," and 10 percent "Worse," the Diffusion Index would be 55 percent (20% + [0.50 x 70%]). A reading of 50 percent indicates "no change" from the previous month. Economists and statisticians have determined that the farther the index is away from the amount that would indicate "no change" (50 percent), the rate of change is greater. Therefore, an index of 60% indicates a faster rate of increase than an index of 55% (increased activity is becoming more dispersed), and an index of 35% indicates a faster rate of decrease than an index of 40% (decreased activity is becoming more dispersed). A value of 100 indicates all respondents are reporting increased activity while 0 indicates that all respondents report decreased activity.

== ISM Supply Chain Planning Forecasts (formerly Semiannual Economic Forecasts) ==
The ISM Supply Chain Planning Forecasts (formerly Semiannual Economic Forecasts) are released in May and December and provide insight into both the manufacturing and non-manufacturing sectors of the U.S. economy. The data in the current report compares information from the previous report versus what current conditions are. This report also offers a forecast for the next six months.

== Media ==
Most major financial media agencies cover the Report each month on the first and third business day of the month. Articles regularly appear in The Wall Street Journal, Financial Times, MarketWatch, MNI, Bloomberg and others.

== Controversy ==
On June 2, 2014, ISM released the ROB and then revised it twice in the span of about two-and-a-half hours, a highly unusual event. The initial figure of 53.2 was lower than anticipated and indicated a slowing of the pace of factory-sector growth, and this caused stocks to dip instantly. Economists immediately queried the accuracy of the report and determined that ISM had incorrectly applied seasonal adjustments from the previous month.

ISM's final correction of 55.4 was almost in line with Wall Street expectations, indicating brisk growth, and the stock market rebounded quickly and closed the day with a modest gain. In a statement, ISM attributed the errant report to a software glitch that "incorrectly used the seasonal adjustment factor from the previous month."
