= Referent power =

Power of a charismatic leader

As United States ambassador to France, Benjamin Franklin often charmed the French nobility with his fur hat, giving him the expression of a rustic New World figure. It contributed to both a fur hat craze in Paris and the eventual French involvement in the American Revolutionary War.

Referent power is reverence gained by a leader who has strong interpersonal relationship skills. Referent power, as an aspect of personal power, becomes important when leadership increasingly relies on collaboration and influence rather than command and control.

In a diplomatic setting, referent power is most easily seen in the charismatic leader who excels in making others feel comfortable in his or her presence. People typically express their excitement about work in terms of their attraction to their leader's personal characteristics and charisma. They commit to their work because of the leader's likability, and they base their self-esteem and sense of accomplishment on their leader's approval.

Referent power may be defined as 'the ability of a leader to influence a follower due to the follower's admiration, respect, or identification with the leader'. It has been suggested that the term referent power may reflect a misspelling, with a more appropriate label being reverent power. The Cambridge English Dictionary defines reverent as "showing great respect and admiration", whereas "referent" is typically defined as "the thing that a symbol stands for, or refers to". Bertram Raven states that "Referent power stems from the target identifying with the agent, or seeing the agent as a model that the target would want to emulate".

== See also ==
- Power (social and political)
- French and Raven's bases of power
- Benjamin Franklin
