= Keith Oliver =

British logistician

- Born: United Kingdom
- Occupation: Logistician
- Years active: 1982–present

Keith Oliver is a British logistician and consultant known for coining the term "Supply Chain Management", first using it in public in an interview with Arnold Kransdorff, then working for the Financial Times, on 4 June 1982.

== Education and career ==
Keith Oliver was educated in the United Kingdom at Monmouth School and Birmingham University.

He is currently on the staff of the management consulting firms Booz & Company / Booz Allen Hamilton, and worked previously as Senior Organisations and Methods Analyst at the West Midlands Gas Board, and then as a consultant for Business Operations Research (Systems) Limited.

According to Damon Schechter, Oliver played a critical role in ushering in the third significant evolution of logistical thought in the 1970s and 1980s and has contributed as author and co-author of numerous articles and the chapter entitled "Distribution: the total cost-to serve" in The Gower Handbook of Management (1983 - 1998).

== Supply Chain Management term coining ==
A 2003 article in a Strategy+Business issue named When Will Supply Chain Management Grow Up? by Tim Laseter and Keith Oliver himself describes anecdotically the moment in which the term Supply Chain Management was coined prior to the Financial Times interview: Oliver began to develop a vision to tear down the functional silos inside an organization (manufacturing, marketing, distribution, sales and finance). He and his team called it Integrated Inventory Management, abbreviated I2M in the late 70's. They believed that the term was catchy and the I2M acronym would be well received, but it all changed during a key steering committee meeting with Dutch electronics giant Philips. At the meeting, he and his team found out that their catchy phrase was not that catchy, and Oliver was challenged by one of the customer's managers, Mr. Van t'Hoff. Oliver explained Mr. Van t'Hoff what he meant by I2M: “We’re talking about the management of a chain of supply as though it were a single entity,” Mr. Oliver replied, “not a group of disparate functions.” “Then why don’t you call it that?” Mr. Van t’Hoff said. “Call it what?” Mr. Oliver asked. “Total supply chain management.”

Scott Stephens, former Chair of the Supply-Chain Council (SCC) (1983–1997) and former chief technology officer of the SCC (1997–2005), states in his blog that after knowing the story, he was not really sure if it was Keith Oliver or Mr. Van t'Hoff who coined the term. But as Oliver developed the concept prior to the meeting and used it first in public during the Financial Times interview, gives credit to Oliver's story to be the Ring of Truth.

== Keith Oliver's Supply Chain Management definition ==
Oliver defined in 1982 the Supply Chain concept as follows: “Supply chain management (SCM) is the process of planning, implementing, and controlling the operations of the supply chain with the purpose to satisfy customer requirements as efficiently as possible. Supply chain management spans all movement and storage of raw materials, work-in-process inventory, and finished goods from point-of-origin to point-of-consumption”. Since then, almost all Supply Chain Book authors have developed their own definitions. Some of them are subtle variations and others add more detail, but most of them remain close to Oliver's original definition.

== Supply Chain Management term's adulthood and 30th anniversary ==
Keith Oliver was highlighted and often cited in articles and books during the 2002-2003 period due to the fact that the Supply Chain Management term reached its "adulthood" with 21 years. The term's "adulthood" was an opportunity for some publications to reflect about the concept's evolution over 21 years. A similar effect was experienced in 2012 due to the term's 30th anniversary, although critics argue that the celebration was being used mostly for some firms' marketing strategies.
