= Institute for Supply Management =

Supply management organization

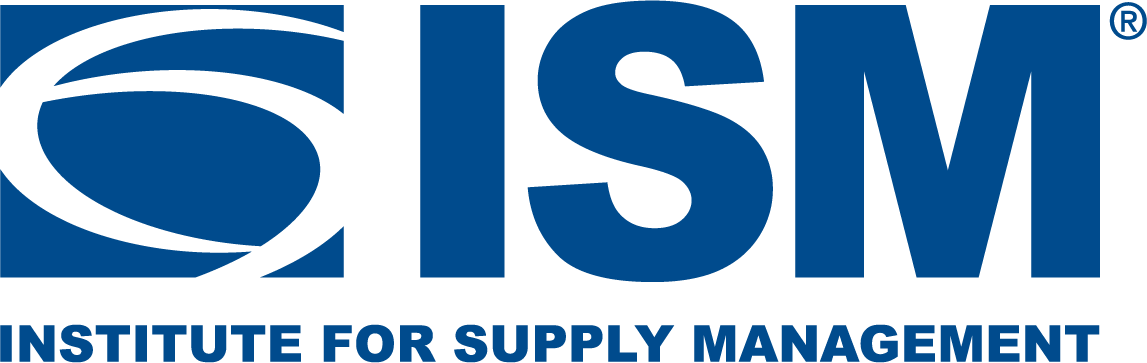
- Institute for Supply Management Logo
- Abbreviation: ISM
- Formation: 1915
- Type: Non-profit
- Purpose: Supply management
- Headquarters: Tempe, Arizona
- Location: United States
- Region served: Worldwide
- Members: 50,000+
- Chief Executive Officer: Neal J. Couture
- Website: Official website

The Institute for Supply Management (ISM) is the world's oldest and largest supply management association. Founded in 1915, the U.S.-based not-for-profit educational association serves professionals and organizations with interest in supply chain management, providing education, training, qualifications, publications, information, and research.

ISM serves a community of over 200,000 professionals in more than 100 countries. It offers three qualifications, the Certified Professional in Supply Management (CPSM), Certified Professional in Supplier Diversity (CPSD), and the Associate Professional in Supply Management (APSM).

== History ==
The Institute for Supply Management originated in 1915 as the National Association of Purchasing Agents (NAPA).

In the early twentieth century, the purchasing function typically did not enjoy the full support of management, which was typically indifferent to its potential. Prior to 1915, local purchasing associations had formed in at least 10 major cities in the U.S., including in Buffalo (one of the most active groups, founded in 1904). Some purchasing officials decided to form a national group to advance their profession and share useful information among members, but support was spotty. Organizers had to overcome distrust over concerns that their participation would reveal trade secrets. As Charles A. Steele, president of NAPA stated in 1923:

... it had been a sort of unwritten rule that purchasers were one body of men who should not communicate with each other for fear that they might do the other fellow some good and themselves some harm.

Elwood B. Hendricks, a salesman working for the Thomas Publishing Company, became the driving force behind forming a national purchasing association. In 1913, Hendricks's plan began to bear fruit when he helped form the Purchasing Agents Association of New York that became the nucleus of the national organization. The New York group applied for and received a charter for NAPA in 1915. The first local groups to affiliate association were New York City and Pittsburgh in 1915 and Columbus in 1916. South Bend, Cleveland, Chicago, St. Louis, Philadelphia, Detroit and Los Angeles followed in 1917. Buffalo affiliated with NAPA in 1918. By 1920 over 30 affiliates had joined and that number continued to grow. The group gave Hendricks an honorary lifetime membership.

The goals of NAPA were to:

- Impress the business world with the importance of the purchasing function to economic well-being.
- Encourage purchasing people to improve themselves and make greater contributions to the companies they serve.

NAPA held its first convention in New York in 1916 with 100 of its 250 members in attendance. That year NAPA launched a magazine, The Purchasing Agent, that was to have an immense impact on the success of the organization and eventually evolve into Inside Supply Management magazine. In 1918, approximately one thousand members were expected to attend that year's national convention.

=== World War I and the 1920s ===
With the entry of the United States into World War I in 1917, NAPA offered its services to the war effort. Materials were in short supply and procurement had become more complicated as the U.S. government "attempted to guide economic activity via centralized price and production controls". During this period NAPA members helped establish purchasing courses at New York University and Harvard. The association began developing professional standards including a code of ethics for the purchasing profession.

During World War I, NAPA called for the centralization of War Department purchasing to reduce inefficiency and graft. The association advocated standardization in the purchase and use of coal and the prosecution of profiteers. Its crusade for ethical standards resulted in the Purchasing Agent’s Creed that observers hailed for decades as one of the outstanding moral statements in modern business. In 1928, it released the Standards for Buying and Selling with the recognition that buying and selling should be mutually profitable and that cooperation would reduce the cost of purchasing.

=== Great Depression and World War II ===
Harvard Business School published two purchasing textbooks and it developed case studies about purchasing problems, all under the auspices of NAPA. The association commissioned a two-volume work on purchasing practices and procedures.

In 1931, the association established the J. Shipman Gold Medal Award, the highest honor in the field, bestowed on an individual for exceptional performance in supply management.

NAPA created its Business Survey Panel in 1931 and began polling members on commodities. The U.S. Chamber of Commerce began using these reports when compiling information for the federal government. These reports eventually evolved into the association's market-moving report now known as the ISM Report On Business.

When World War II broke out, NAPA kept its members updated on government requirements and regulations concerning wartime production. As the government placed controls on producers and consumers, many of NAPA’s members played a critical role.

=== NAPA rebranded as NAPM ===
By the 1950s, memberships reached 15,000. In the U.S., purchasing had transformed into a vital management function. In 1968, NAPA renamed itself the National Association of Purchasing Management, Inc. (NAPM).

In 1974, NAPM introduced the Certified Purchasing Manager (C.P.M.) qualification, the first professional certification in the field.

In 1976, NAPM conducted its first ever onsite plant training. NAPM became involved in minority and women's initiatives and elected May Warzocha as its first woman president in 1979. In 1987, it formed the Minority Business Development Group to assist members with their minority supplier programs.

The Report On Business continued to gain recognition as a reliable near-term economic barometer. In 1982, NAPM introduced the Purchasing Manager's Index (PMI) and in 1988 it added diffusion indexes and introduced a graph format. In 1989, the U.S. Department of Commerce began including NAPM's data as a component of its Index of Leading Indicators and the Chairman of the Federal Reserve praised the Report. In 1998, the association developed the Non-Manufacturing Report On Business.

=== Transformation to ISM ===
Over time, purchasing professionals were becoming more responsible for the larger function of the supply of goods and services instead of strictly purchasing. To more accurately reflect this expanded scope, NAPM members voted in April 2001 to change the organization's name to Institute for Supply Management (ISM).

In 2002, ISM launched its sustainability and social responsibility initiative, and in 2004 issued its ISM Principles of Social Responsibility, a first for the supply management profession.

In 2005, ISM partnered with the R. Gene and Nancy D. Richter Foundation to expand the R. Gene Richter Scholarship Program into the largest national scholarship program in the field of supply chain management. Together, in 2008, they established the ISM R. Gene Richter Scholarship Program Fund with a goal of funding scholarships on an ongoing basis.

In 2008, ISM introduced a new professional qualification, the Certified Professional in Supply Management (CPSM), to succeed the Certified Purchasing Manager (C.P.M.) credential.

In 2011, ISM introduced the Certified Professional in Supplier Diversity (CPSD) certification to create experts who could help guide their companies through supplier diversity issues, harness underutilized, innovative suppliers and tap new markets. That same year, ISM began its Corporate Program to help the employees of corporate members perform at a higher level.

In 2023, ISM introduced the Associate Professional in Supply Management (APSM) certification to create a pathway for students to achieve the CPSM earlier in their careers.

ISM introduced the ISM Mastery Model in 2015. Later renamed to ISM Capability Model, it covers 16 core competencies and 73 sub-competencies. The model and its assessment tool identify employee skills gaps and solutions to close them. It allows companies to benchmark team member skills and create a development roadmap and set job expectations.

== Supply Chain Management ==
ISM defines supply chain management as:

...the end-to-end management of all supply, operations and logistics functions used in the flow of goods, services and information from raw material through the finished product or service’s sustainable resolution.

By effective oversight and engagement of people, processes and relationships, supply chain management creates competitive advantage through innovation, cost management, quality improvement, asset optimization, risk mitigation, social responsibility and sustainability.

Topics included as part of supply chain management:

- Purchasing/procurement
- Strategic sourcing
- Logistics
- Quality
- Inventory control
- Materials management
- Warehousing/stores
- Transportation/traffic/shipping
- Disposition/investment recovery
- Distribution
- Receiving
- Packaging
- Product/service development
- Manufacturing supervision

== Current Certification Programs ==
Certified Professional in Supply Management® (CPSM®)

The Certified Professional in Supply Management (CPSM) certification addresses the changing demands of the profession and the international marketplace. According to ISM's 2025 annual salary survey, the average salary for a CPSM holder is $150,151.

Certified Professional in Supplier Diversity® (CPSD®)

ISM's Certified Professional in Supplier Diversity (CPSD) is the only certification for professionals whose responsibilities include supplier diversity. It is supported by various diversity organizations such as the National Minority Supplier Development Council and the Women's Business Enterprise National Council. According to ISM's 2025 annual salary survey, the average salary for a CPSD holder is $140,724.

Associate Professional in Supply Management® (APSM®)

During the beginning of a supply chain career or transition, an APSM certification is said to help people stand out from the professional competition.

== Legacy Certification Programs ==
Prior to launching its current certification programs, the Institute for Supply Management (ISM) offered two professional credentials. The Certified Purchasing Manager (C.P.M.) and the Accredited Purchasing Practitioner (A.P.P.) programs are no longer open to new applicants, but current credential holders remain eligible for recertification and lifetime certification. Both the C.P.M. and A.P.P. credentials were broadly designed for individuals working in private, public, and non-profit organizations.

Certified Purchasing Manager (C.P.M.)

The Certified Purchasing Manager (C.P.M.) designation was introduced in 1974, becoming the first major professional certification and the first nationally accepted standard of competence and knowledge in the rapidly rising field of purchasing and supply management. No longer offered for testing, ISM continues to recertify C.P.M.s who meet continuing education requirements. According to ISM's 2025 annual salary survey, the average salary for a Certified Purchasing Manager (C.P.M.) is $161,455.

Accredited Purchasing Practitioner (A.P.P.)

The Accredited Purchasing Practitioner (A.P.P.) program was established in 1996 for entry-level buyers primarily engaged in the tactical and operational side of purchasing and those working outside the organization's purchasing and supply management department but who have definite procurement responsibilities. No longer offered for testing, ISM continues to recertify A.P.P.s who meet continuing education requirements. According to ISM's 2025 annual salary survey, the average salary for an Accredited Purchasing Practitioner (A.P.P.) is $191,333.

== Publications ==
=== ISM® PMI® Reports ===
ISM^{®} PMI^{®} Reports (formerly the ISM^{®} [./Https://www.ismworld.org/supply-management-news-and-reports/reports/ism-pmi-reports/ Report On Business]^{®}) offer some of the most reliable economic indicators available, providing guidance to supply chain management professionals, economists, analysts, government and business leaders. The Report is based on two national surveys of supply chain professionals tracking changes in the manufacturing, non-manufacturing sectors and hospital subsectors.

=== Inside Supply Management ===
ISM publishes a members-only magazine, Inside Supply Management.

=== Principles and Standards of Ethical Supply Management Conduct with Guidelines ===
This document was approved by the ISM Board of Directors in 2012 and published in 2016. A comparable 1986 publication of the Purchasing Management Association of Arizona (now known as ISM—Arizona) was used as a model.

== Education ==
ISM offers a curriculum addressing all areas of supply, but with a particular focus on sourcing and procurement, available in different formats.

- Online courses
- Classroom training
- Guided Learning
- Onsite training
- Virtual learning
- Conferences and events
- Webinars

== Products and services ==
- CPSM, CPSD and APSM professional certifications
- ISM Report On Business
- Conferences
- Seminars
- Corporate training
- Career Center
- Scholarships and Awards

== CAPS Research ==
CAPS Research, or the Center for Advanced Procurement Strategy, is a B2B nonprofit research center at Arizona State University, serving supply management leaders at Fortune 1000 companies. CAPS was established in 1986 at the W. P. Carey School of Business at Arizona State University in partnership with Institute for Supply Management. In 2026, CAPS Research transitioned to a sole entity of Arizona State University.

== Controversies ==
In 2013, the U.S. Securities and Exchange Commission (SEC) investigated the early release of the June 2013 Manufacturing ISM Report On Business by mass media and information firm Thomson Reuters. According to a CNBC article high-speed trading surged 15 milliseconds before the report was scheduled to be released:

...ISM's manufacturing data was inadvertently sent out early by Thomson Reuters on June 3rd to its high-speed clients, many of whom immediately traded on the information. There was a sharp market reaction to that burst of trading, which prompted downward moves in the SPY ETF, which serves as an investing tool for traders to bet on the overall direction of the market. That downward surge [allowed insiders] more than enough time to profit from early knowledge of market-moving information.

After a telephone inquiry from the SEC about the early release of the data, Thomson Reuters issued a statement explaining that the early release was due to a clock synchronization issue. At the SEC's request, the firm voluntarily provided a redacted copy of its contract with ISM. In an interview with CNBC, ISM CEO Thomas Derry said that after speaking with Thomson Reuters about the mechanics of their release process, he was confident it was an isolated occurrence. He also indicated that “We have not been contacted by any government entity.”

On June 2, 2014, ISM released the ISM Report On Business, its closely followed monthly manufacturing report, and then revised it twice in the span of about two-and-a-half hours, a highly unusual event. The initial figure of 53.2 was lower than anticipated and indicated a slowing of the pace of factory-sector growth, and this caused stocks to dip immediately. Economists disputed the report's accuracy.

ISM's final correction of 55.4 was almost in line with Wall Street expectations, indicating brisk growth, and the stock market rebounded quickly and closed the day with a modest gain. In a statement, ISM attributed the errant report to a software glitch that "incorrectly used the seasonal adjustment factor from the previous month."
