= Channel coordination =

Channel coordination (or supply chain coordination) aims at improving supply chain performance by aligning the plans and the objectives of individual enterprises. It usually focuses on inventory management and ordering decisions in distributed inter-company settings. Channel coordination models may involve multi-echelon inventory theory, multiple decision makers, asymmetric information, as well as recent paradigms of manufacturing, such as mass customization, short product life-cycles, outsourcing and delayed differentiation. The theoretical foundations of the coordination are based chiefly on the contract theory. The problem of channel coordination was first modeled and analyzed by Anantasubramania Kumar in 1992.

== Overview ==
The decentralized decision making in supply chains leads to a dilemma situation which results in a suboptimal overall performance called double marginalization. Recently, partners in permanent supply chains tend to extend the coordination of their decisions in order to improve the performance for all of the participants. Some practical realizations of this approach are Collaborative Planning, Forecasting, and Replenishment (CPFR), Vendor Managed Inventory (VMI) and Quick Response (QR).

The theory of channel coordination aims at supporting the performance optimization by developing arrangements for aligning the different objectives of the partners. These are called coordination mechanisms or schemes, which control the flows of information, materials (or service) and financial assets along the chains. In general, a contracting scheme should consist of the following components:

- local planning methods which consider the constraints and objectives of the individual partners,
- an infrastructure and protocol for information sharing, and
- an incentive scheme for aligning the individual interests of the partners.

The appropriate planning methods are necessary for optimizing the behavior of the production. The second component should support the information visibility and transparency both within and among the partners and facilitates the realization of real-time enterprises. Finally, the third component should guarantee that the partners act upon to the common goals of the supply chain.

The general method for studying coordination consists of two steps. At first, one assumes a central decision maker with complete information who solves the problem. The result is a first-best solution which provides bound on the obtainable system-wide performance objective. In the second step one regards the decentralized problem and designs such a contract protocol that approaches or even achieves the performance of the first-best.

A contract is said to coordinate the channel, if thereby the partners' optimal local decisions lead to optimal system-wide performance. Channel coordination is achievable in several simple models, but it is more difficult (or even impossible) in more realistic cases and in the practice. Therefore, the aim is often only the achievement of mutual benefit compared to the uncoordinated situation.

Another widely studied alternative direction for channel coordination is the application of some negotiation protocols. Such approaches apply iterative solution methods, where the partners exchange proposals and counter-proposals until an agreement is reached. For this reason, this approach is commonly referred to as collaborative planning. The negotiation protocols can be characterized according to the following criteria:

- The initial proposal is most frequently generated by the buyer company which is called upstream planning. By contrast, when the initiator is the supplier, it is referred to as downstream planning. In several cases there already exists an initial plan (e.g., using rolling schedules or frame plans). There are also some protocols where the initial plan is generated randomly.
- In order to guarantee finite runtime, the maximal number of rounds should be determined. In addition, the protocol should also specify the number of plans offered in each round. When the number of rounds or plans is high, the practical application necessitates fast local planner systems in order to quickly evaluate the proposals and generate counter-proposals.
- Generally, the negotiation protocols cannot provide optimality, and they require some special conditions to assure convergence.
- The counter-proposals usually define side-payments (compensations) between the companies in order to inspire the partner deviating from its previously proposed plan.

An also commonly used instrument for aligning plans of different decision makers is the application of some auction mechanisms. However, “auctions are most applicable in pure market interactions at the boundaries of a supply chain but not within a supply chain″, therefore they are usually not considered as channel coordination approaches.

== Characteristics of coordination schemes ==
There are several classifications of channel coordination contracts, but they are not complete, and the considered classes are not disjoint. Instead of a complete classification, a set of aspects are enumerated below which generalizes the existing taxonomies by allowing classification along multiple viewpoints.

=== Problem characteristics ===
==== Horizon ====
Most of the related models consider either one-period horizon or two-period horizon with forecast update. In the latter, the production can be based on the preliminary forecast with normal production mode or on the updated forecast with emergency production, which means shorter lead-time, but higher cost. Besides, the horizon can consist of multiple periods and it can be even infinite. The practically most widespread approach is the rolling horizon planning, i.e., updating and extending an existing plan in each period.

==== Number of products ====
Almost all contract-based models regard only one product. Some models study the special cases of substitute or complementary products. However, considering more products in the general case is necessary if technological or financial constraints—like capacity or budget limits—exist.

==== Demand characteristic ====
On one hand, the demand can be stochastic (uncertain) or deterministic. On the other hand, it can be considered static (constant over time) or dynamic (e.g., having seasonality).

==== Risk treatment ====
In most of the models the players are regarded to be risk neutral. This means that they intend to maximize their expected profit (or minimize their expected costs). However, some studies regard risk averse players who want to find an acceptable trade-off considering both the expected value and the variance of the profit.

==== Shortage treatment ====
The models differ in their attitude towards stockouts. Most authors consider either backlogs, when the demand must be fulfilled later at the expense of providing lower price or lost sales which also includes some theoretical costs (e.g., loss of goodwill, loss of profit, etc.). Some models include a service level constraint, which limits the occurrence or quantity of expected stockouts. Even the 100% service level can be achieved with additional or emergency production (e.g., overtime, outsourcing) for higher costs.

==== Parameters and variables ====
This viewpoint shows the largest variations in the different models. The main decision variables are quantity-related (production quantity, order quantity, number of options, etc.), but sometimes prices are also decision variables. The parameters can be either constant or stochastic. The most common parameters are related to costs: fixed (ordering or setup) cost, production cost and inventory holding cost. These are optional; many models disregard fixed or inventory holding costs. There exist numerous other parameters: prices for the different contracts, salvage value, shortage penalty, lead-time, etc.

==== Basic model and solution technique ====
Most of the one-period models apply the newsvendor model. On two-period horizon, this is extended with the possibility of two production modes. On a multiple period horizon the base-stock, or in case of deterministic demand the EOQ models are the most widespread. In such cases the optimal solution can be determined with simple algebraic operations. These simple models usually completely disregard technological constraints; however, in real industrial cases resource capacity, inventory or budget constraints may be relevant. This necessitates more complex models, such as LP, MIP, stochastic program, and thus more powerful mathematical programming techniques may be required.

As for the optimization criteria, the most usual objectives are the profit maximization or cost minimization, but other alternatives are also conceivable, e.g., throughput time minimization. Considering multiple criteria is not yet prevalent in the coordination literature.

=== Decentralization characteristics ===
==== Number and role of the players ====
The most often studied dilemmas involve the two players and call them customer and supplier (or buyer-seller). There are also extensions of this simple model: the multiple customers with correlated demand and the multiple suppliers with different production parameters. Multi-echelon extensions are also conceivable, however, sparse in the literature. When the coordination is within a supply chain (typically a customer-supplier relation), it is called vertical, otherwise horizontal. An example for the latter is when different suppliers of the same customer coordinate their transportation.

Sometimes the roles of the participants are also important. The most frequently considered companies are manufacturers, retailers, distributors or logistic companies.

==== Relation of the players ====
One of the most important characteristics of the coordination is the power relations of the players. The power is influenced by several factors, such as possessed process know-how, number of competitors, ratio in the value creation, access to the market and financial resources.

The players can behave in a cooperative or opportunistic way. In the former case, they share a common goal and act like a team, while in the latter situation each player is interested only in its own goals. These two behaviors are usually present in a mixed form, since the opportunistic claims for profitability and growth are sustainable usually only with a certain cooperative attitude.

The relation can be temporary or permanent. In the temporary case usually one- or two-period models are applied, or even an auction mechanism. However, the coordination is even more important in permanent relations, where the planning is usually done in a rolling horizon manner. When coordinating a permanent supply relation, one has to consider the learning effect, i.e., players intend to learn each other's private information and behavior.

==== Goal of the coordination ====
The simplest possible coordination is aimed only at aligning the (material) flows within the supply chain in order to gain executable plans and avoid shortages. In a more advanced form of coordination, the partners intend to improve supply chain performance by approaching or even achieving the optimal plan according to some criteria. Generally, a coordinated plan may incur losses for some of the players compared to the uncoordinated situation, which necessitates some kind of side-payment in order to provide a win-win situation. In addition, even some sort of fairness may be required, but it is not only hard to guarantee, but even to define.

Most of the coordination approaches requires that the goal should be achieved in an equilibrium in order to exclude the possibility that an opportunistic player deviates from the coordinated plan.

==== Information structure ====
Some papers study the symmetric information case, when all of the players know exactly the same parameters. This approach is very convenient for cost and profit sharing, since all players know the incurring system cost. The asymmetric case, when there is an information gap between the players is more realistic, but poses new challenges. The asymmetry typically concerns either the cost parameters, the capacities or the quantities like the demand forecast. The demand and the forecast are often considered to be qualitative, limited to only two possible values: high and low. In case of stochastic demand, the uncertainty of the forecasts can also be private information.

==== Decision structure ====
The decision making roles of the players depend on the specified decision variables. However, there is a more-or-less general classification in this aspect: forced and voluntary compliance. Under forced compliance the supplier is responsible for satisfying all orders of the customer, therefore it does not have the opportunity to decide about the production quantity. Under voluntary compliance, the supplier decides about the production quantity and it cannot be forced to fill an order. This latter is more complex analytically, but more realistic as well. Even so, several papers assume that the supplier decides about the price and then the customer decides the order quantity.

==== Game theoretic model ====
From the viewpoint of game theory the models can take cooperative or non-cooperative approaches. The cooperative approach studies, how the players form coalitions therefore these models are usually applied on the strategic level of network design. Other typical form of cooperative games involves some bargaining framework—e.g., the Nash bargaining model—for agreeing upon the parameters of the applied contracts.

On the other hand, on the operational level, the non-cooperative approach is used. Usually the sequential Stackelberg game model is considered, where one of the players, the leader moves first and then the follower reacts. Both cases—the supplier or the customer as the Stackelberg leader—are widely studied in the literature. In case of information asymmetry, a similar sequential model is used and it is called principal–agent setting. The study of the long-term supply relationship can also be modeled as a repeated game.

To sum up, a collaboration generally consists of a cooperative, followed by a non-cooperative game. However, most researches concentrate only on one of the phases.

==== Involvement of a mediator ====
Some coordination mechanisms require the existence of an independent, trusted third party. If such a mediator exists, the powerful theory of the market mechanism design can be applied for channel coordination. Although at first glance the involvement of a third party seems to be unrealistic, in the area of planning such mediators already exist as application service providers.

== Contract types ==
There are many variants of the contracts, some widespread forms are briefly described below. Besides, there exist several combinations and customized approaches, too.

=== Two-part tariff ===
In this case the customer pays not only for the purchased goods, but in addition a fixed amount called franchise fee per order. This is intended to compensate the supplier for his fixed setup cost.

=== Sales rebate ===
This contract specifies two prices and a quantity threshold. If the order size is below the threshold, the customer pays the higher price, and if it is above, she pays a lower price for the units above the threshold.

=== Quantity discount ===
Under quantity discount contract, the customer pays a wholesale price depending on the order quantity. This resembles to the sales rebate contract, but there is no threshold defined. The mechanism for specifying the contract can be complex. The contract has been applied in many situations, for example, in an international supply chain with fluctuating exchange rates.

=== Capacity options ===
While advance capacity purchase is popular in the supply chain practice, there are situations where a manufacturer prefers to delay its capacity purchase to have better information about the uncertain demand.

=== Buyback/return ===
With these types of contracts the supplier offers that it will buy back the remaining obsolete inventory at a discounted price. This supports the sharing of inventory risk between the partners. A variation of this contract is the backup agreement, where the customer gives a preliminary forecast and then makes an order less or equal to the forecasted quantity. If the order is less, it must also pay a proportional penalty for the remaining obsolete inventory. Buyback agreements are widespread in the newspaper, book, CD and fashion industries.

=== Quantity flexibility ===
In this case the customer gives a preliminary forecast and then it can give fixed order in an interval around the forecast. Such contracts are widespread in several markets, e.g., among the suppliers of the European automotive industry.

=== Revenue sharing ===
With revenue sharing the customer pays not only for the purchased goods, but also shares a given percentage of her revenue with the supplier. This contract is successfully used in video cassette rental and movie exhibition fields. It can be proved, that the optimal revenue sharing and buyback contracts are equivalent, i.e., they generate the same profits for the partners.

=== Options ===
The option contracts are originated from the product and stock exchange. With an option contract, the customer can give fixed orders in advance, as well as buy rights to purchase more (call option) or return (put option) products later. The options can be bought at a predefined option price and executed at the execution price. This approach is a generalization of some previous contract types.

=== VMI contract ===
This contract can be used when the buyer does not order, only communicates the forecasts and consumes from the inventory filled by the supplier. The VMI contract specifies that not only the consumed goods should be paid, but also the forecast imprecision, i.e., the difference between the estimated and realized demand. In this way, the buyer is inspired to increase the forecast quality, and the risk of market uncertainty is shared between the partners.

== See also ==
- Contract theory
- Supply Chain Management
- Negotiation theory

== Books ==
- Tsan-Ming Choi, T.C. Edwin Cheng (Eds.) Supply Chain Coordination under Uncertainty, Springer, International Handbooks on Information Systems Series, 2011.
