= Certified Professional in Supply Management =

Supply management professional certification

The Certified Professional in Supply Management (CPSM) is a globally recognized professional credential offered by the Institute for Supply Management (ISM) Being certified as a CPSM indicates the holder has achieved mastery of supply management’s core competencies. The certification program’s emphasis on strategic supply chain integration, along with procurement and Supply Chain Management, prepares the practitioner to move beyond tactical thinking in order to generate strategic solutions and to evolve continually in the rapidly changing supply management environment.

Since the certification program's inception, ISM has granted nearly 13,000 CPSMs and has current CPSM holders in 68 countries.

== History ==
Up until 2008, the highest credential that ISM offered was the Certified Purchasing Manager (C.P.M.) designation, which the organization first offered in 1974. The C.P.M. required qualified applicants to pass four exam modules that measured their aptitude in areas such as purchasing, supplier relations, quality issues, business law, personnel challenges, diversity and more. As respected as the C.P.M. was in the procurement profession, ISM determined that a new level of certification was needed to address the evolving needs of the supply management professional and the increasing complexity of business, including the intricacies of globalization.

ISM’s development of the CPSM qualification allowed it to move beyond a narrow focus on purchasing to roles that require a broader knowledge of supply management and leadership. With the introduction of the new qualification, ISM discontinued testing for the C.P.M. designation and transitioned it to a recertification-only status. During a transitional period that ended in 2015, ISM offered those holding a C.P.M. qualification the opportunity to take a bridge exam to qualify for a CPSM certification.

== Criteria ==
To obtain a CPSM designation, the association requires candidates to have three years of full-time, professional supply management experience (nonclerical, nonsupport) with a regionally accredited bachelor's degree or international equivalent or five years of supply management experience (nonclerical, nonsupport) without a degree. Before qualifying for the CPSM designation, candidates must pass three exam modules.

== Exam Focus ==
Each of the three required CPSM exam modules has a different focus. The exam modules can be taken in any order.

Exam 1: Supply Management Core

- Sourcing
- Category management
- Negotiation
- Legal & Contractual
- Supplier Relationship Management
- Cost & Price management
- Financial Analysis

Exam 2: Supply Management Integration

- Supply chain strategy
- Demand planning
- Forecasting
- Product & service
- Quality management
- Logistics & materials management
- Project Management

Exam 3: Leadership & Transformation in Supply Management

- Leadership
- Strategy development
- Stakeholder engagement
- People development & coaching
- Systems capabilities & technology
- Risk & Compliance
- Corporate Social Responsibility

== Maintaining Certification ==
To maintain the integrity of the credential, ISM requires CPSM holders to continue learning and developing their skills throughout their career. The CPSM certification is valid for three years, and the holder must apply for recertification to maintain the designation. To be eligible for recertification, CPSM holders must earn 60 hours of approved continuing education through any combination of:

- Taking semester-long college courses.
- Attending seminars, conferences, and educational programs; teaching courses; and publishing journal articles.
- Participating in work-related training (either taken or taught) involving business-related topics.
- Contributing to the profession (holding certain offices in ISM or an ISM affiliates).
- Retaking CPSM exams (during a certain time frame) or obtaining a Certified Professional in Supplier Diversity (CPSD) certification from ISM.

After a designated one-year grace period, a professional whose certification has lapsed must retake all three exams.
