= History of insurance =

Development of insurance practices and institutions from antiquity to the present

The history of insurance traces the development of the modern business of insurance against risks, especially regarding cargo, property, death, automobile accidents, and medical treatment.

The insurance industry helps to eliminate risks (as when fire-insurance providers demand the implementation of safe practices and the installation of hydrants), spreads risks from individuals to the larger community, and provides an important source of long-term finance for both the public and private sectors.

== Ancient era ==
In December 1901 and January 1902, at the direction of archaeologist Jacques de Morgan, Father Jean-Vincent Scheil found a 2.25 meter (or 88.5 inch) tall basalt or diorite stele in three pieces inscribed with 4,130 lines of cuneiform law dictated by Hammurabi (c. 1792–1750 BCE) of the First Babylonian Empire in the city of Shush, Iran. Code of Hammurabi Law 100 stipulated repayment by a debtor of a loan to a creditor on a schedule with a maturity date specified in written contractual terms. Laws 101 and 102 stipulated that a shipping agent, factor, or ship charterer was only required to repay the principal of a loan to their creditor in the event of a net income loss or a total loss due to an Act of God. Law 103 stipulated that an agent, factor, or charterer was by force majeure relieved of their liability for an entire loan in the event that the agent, factor, or charterer was the victim of theft during the term of their charterparty upon provision of an affidavit of the theft to their creditor.

Code of Hammurabi Law 104 stipulated that a carrier (agents, factors, or charterers) issue a waybill and invoice for a contract of carriage to a consignee outlining contractual terms for sales, commissions, and laytime and receive a bill of parcel and lien authorizing consignment from the consignee. Law 105 stipulated that claims for losses filed by agents, factors, and charterers without receipts were without standing. Law 126 stipulated that filing a false claim of a loss was punishable by law. Law 235 stipulated that a shipbuilder was liable within one year of construction for the replacement of an unseaworthy vessel to the ship-owner that was lost during the term of a charterparty. Laws 236 and 237 stipulated that a sea captain, ship-manager, or charterer was liable for the replacement of a lost vessel and cargo to the shipowner and consignees respectively that was negligently operated during the term of a charterparty. Law 238 stipulated that a captain, manager, or charterer that saved a ship from total loss was only required to pay one-half the value of the ship to the shipowner. Law 240 stipulated that the owner of a cargo ship that destroyed a passenger ship in a collision was liable for replacement of the passenger ship and any cargo it held upon provision of an affidavit of the collision by the owner of the passenger ship.

In 1816, an archeological excavation in Minya, Egypt (under an Eyalet of the Ottoman Empire) produced a Nerva–Antonine dynasty-era tablet from the ruins of the Temple of Antinous in Antinoöpolis, Aegyptus that prescribed the rules and membership dues of a burial society collegium established in Lanuvium, Italia in approximately 133 AD during the reign of Hadrian (117–138) of the Roman Empire. In 1851, future U.S. Supreme Court Associate Justice Joseph P. Bradley (1870–1892), once employed as an actuary for the Mutual Benefit Life Insurance Company, submitted an article to the Journal of the Institute of Actuaries detailing a historical account of a Severan dynasty-era life table compiled by the Roman jurist Ulpian in approximately 220 CE during the reign of Elagabalus (218–222) that was included in the second volume of the codification of laws ordered by Justinian I (527–565) of the Eastern Roman Empire, the Digesta seu Pandectae (533).

Additionally, the Digesta included a legal opinion written by the Roman jurist Paulus at the beginning of the Crisis of the Third Century in 235 CE on the Lex Rhodia ("Rhodian law") that articulates the general average principle of marine insurance established on the island of Rhodes in approximately 1000 to 800 BCE as a member of the Doric Hexapolis, plausibly by the Phoenicians during the proposed Dorian invasion and emergence of the purported Sea Peoples during the Greek Dark Ages (c. 1100–c. 750) that led to the proliferation of the Doric Greek dialect. The law of general average constitutes the fundamental principle that underlies all insurance.

Insurance in some forms dates back to prehistory. Initially, people sold goods in their own villages or gathering places. However, with the passage of time, they turned to nearby villages to sell. Two types of economies existed in human societies: natural or non-monetary economies (using barter and trade with no centralized nor standardized set of financial instruments) and monetary economies (with markets, currency, financial instruments and so on). Insurance in non-monetary economies entails agreements of mutual aid. Such economies can potentially foster institutions such as co-operatives, guilds and proto-states - institutions functioning to provide mutual protection and to encourage mutual survival in adverse circumstances. The "pay-off" for such "insurance" need not involve financial transactions. If one family's house gets destroyed, the neighbors are committed to helping rebuild it. Public granaries embodied another early form of insurance to indemnify against famines.

Babylonian, Chinese, and Indian traders practiced methods of transferring or distributing risk in a monetary economy in the 3rd and 2nd millennia BCE, respectively. Chinese merchants traversing treacherous river rapids would redistribute their wares across many vessels to limit the loss due to any single vessel's capsizing. The Babylonians developed a system recorded in the famous Code of Hammurabi, c. 1750 BCE, and practiced by early Mediterranean sailing merchants. If a merchant received a loan to fund his shipment, he would pay the lender an additional sum in exchange for the lender's guarantee to cancel the loan should the shipment be stolen or lost at sea. Concepts of insurance has been also found in 3rd century BCE Hindu scriptures such as Dharmasastra, Arthashastra and Manusmriti.

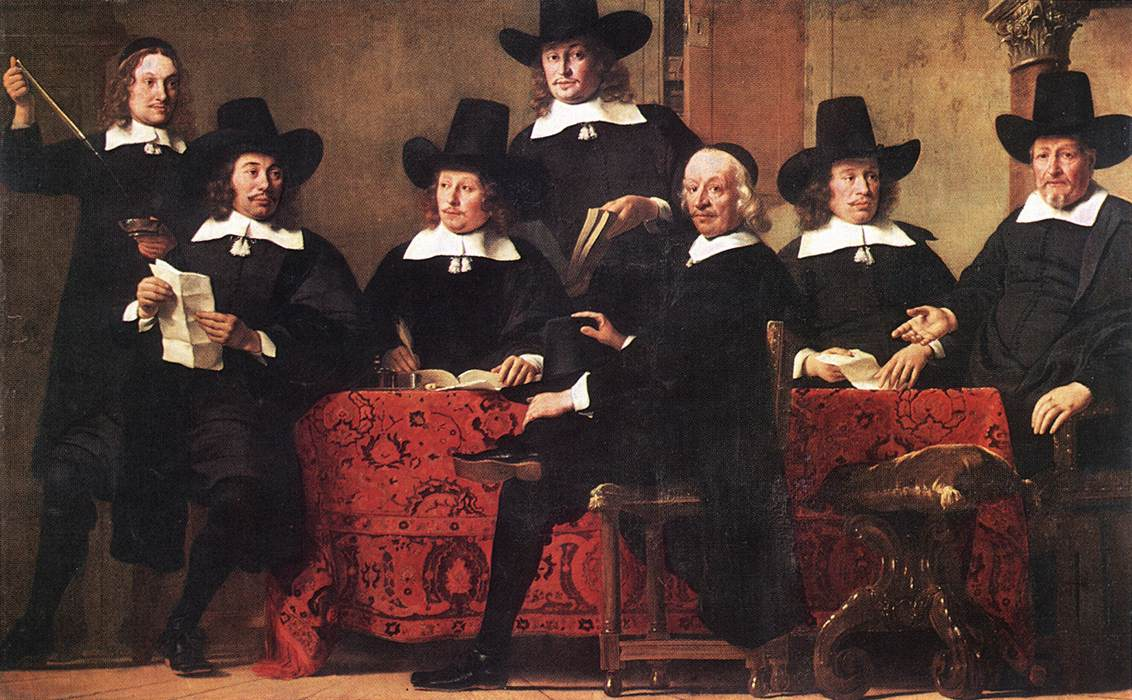
Merchants have sought methods to minimize risks since early times. Pictured, Governors of the Wine Merchant's Guild by Ferdinand Bol, c. 1680.

Achaemenian monarchs in Ancient Persia received annual gifts (tribute) from the various ethnic groups under their control. This would function as an early form of political insurance, and officially bound the Persian monarch to protect the group from harm.

The ancient so-called “Rhodian Sea-Law”, applying to seafarers and merchants, included a stipulation that if a seafarer was forced to throw cargo overboard to save the ship from sinking, the loss would be reimbursed collectively by his colleagues. This is often cited as one of the earliest examples of insurance law, with some putting its origin in the Greek island of Rhodes as early as 1000 BCE. However, the earliest references to the “Rhodian Sea-Law” appear in late Roman legal sources.

The ancient Athenian "maritime loan" advanced money for voyages with repayment being canceled if the ship was lost. In the 4th century BCE, rates for the loans differed according to safe or dangerous times of year, implying an intuitive pricing of risk with an effect similar to insurance.

During the Peloponnesian Wars, some Athenian slave-owners volunteered their slaves to serve as oarsmen in warships. These slave-owners paid a small yearly premium to the Athenian State, which, in case the slave was killed in action, would pay out the owner for the value of the slave.

The Greeks and Romans c. 600 BCE set up collegia, or guilds, called "benevolent societies", which cared for the families of deceased members, as well as paying funeral expenses of members. Guilds in the Middle Ages had similar practices. The Jewish Talmud deals with several aspects of insuring goods. Before modern-style insurance became established in the late 17th century, "friendly societies" existed in England, in which people donated amounts of money to a general sum that could be used for emergencies.

== Medieval era ==
Sea loans (foenus nauticum) were common before the traditional marine insurance in medieval times, in which an investor lent his money to a traveling merchant, and the merchant would be liable to pay it back if the ship returned safely. In this way, credit and sea insurance were provided at the same time. To offset the sea risk involved, the merchant was obligated to pay a high rate of interest, in contrast to overland merchants who merely divided the profits. Pope Gregory IX condemned the foenus nauticum as usury in his decretal Naviganti of 1236 (Decretales, V, XIX, 19) and commenda contracts were introduced in response. Under commenda contracts, investors provided funds to an entrepreneur to carry out a trade, bearing the risk of loss in exchange for a favorable share of the profits when the entrepreneur returned. By the late thirteenth century Italian merchants had begun to separate risk management from finance, accomplishing the latter with cambium contracts based on the purchase of discounted bills of exchange from merchants who did not personally go to sea. To manage the sea risk, the merchants developed the insurance loan: the merchant paid a premium to a shipowner in the form of an unenforceable loan, under an agreement that the shipowner would pay the merchant's losses if his goods did not reach their destination.

In 1293, Denis of Portugal advanced the interests of the Portuguese merchants, and set up by mutual agreement a fund called the Bolsa de Comércio, the first documented form of marine insurance in Europe, approved on 10 May 1293.

In the thirteenth and early fourteenth centuries, the European traders traveled to sell their goods across the globe and to hedge the risk of theft or fraud by the Captain or crew also known as Risicum Gentium. However, they realized that selling this way, involves not only the risk of loss (i.e. damage, theft or life of trader as well) but also they cannot cover the wider market. Therefore, the trend of hiring commissioned base agents across different markets emerged. In 1310 the Chamber of Assurance was established in the Flemish commercial city of Bruges.

The traders sent (exported) their goods to the agents who on the behalf of traders sold them. Sending goods to the agents by road or sea involves different risks i.e. sea storms, pirate attack; goods may be damaged due to poor handling while loading and unloading, etc. Traders exploited different measures to hedge the risk involved in the exporting. Instead of sending all the goods on one ship/truck, they used to send their goods over number of vessels to avoid the total loss of shipment if the vessel was caught in a sea storm, fire, pirate, or came under enemy attacks but this was not good practice due to prolonged time and efforts involved. Insurance is the oldest method of transferring risk, which was developed to mitigate trade/business risk. Marine insurance is very important for international trade and makes large commercial trade possible. The risk hedging instruments used to mitigate risk in medieval times were sea/marine (Mutuum) loans, commenda contract, and bill of exchanges. Nelli (1972) highlighted that commenda contract and sea loans were almost the closest substitute of marine insurance. Furthermore, he pointed out that for a half century, it was considered that the first marine insurance contract was floated in Italy on October 23, 1347; however, professor Federigo found that the first written insurance contracts date back to February 13, 1343, in Pisa. Furthermore, Italian traders spread the knowledge and use of insurance into Europe and The Mediterranean. In the fifteenth century, word policy for insurance contract became standardized. By the sixteenth century, insurance was common among Britain, France, and the Netherlands. The concept of insuring outside native countries emerged in the seventeenth century due to reduced trade or higher cost of local insurance. According to Kingston (2011), Lloyd's Coffeehouse was the prominent marine insurance marketplace in London during the eighteenth century and European/American traders used this marketplace to insure their shipments. The rules and regulations of insurance were adopted from Italian merchants known as “Law Merchant” and initially these rules governed the marine insurance across the globe. In case of dispute, policy writer and holder choose one arbitrator each and these two arbitrators choose a third impartial arbitrator and parties were bound to accept the decision made by the majority. Because of the inability of this informal court (arbitrator) to enforce their decisions, in the sixteenth century, traders turned to formal courts to resolve their disputes. Special courts were set up to solve the disputes of marine insurance like in Genoa, insurance regulation passed to impose fine, on who did not obey the Church's prohibitions of usury (Sea loans, Commenda) in 1369. In 1435, Barcelona ordinance issued, making it mandatory for traders to turn to formal courts in case of insurance disputes. In Venice, “Consoli dei Mercanti”, specialized court to deal with marine insurance were set up in 1436. In 1520, the mercantile court of Genoa was replaced by more specialized court “Rota” which not only followed the merchant's customs but also incorporated the legal laws in it.

Separate insurance contracts (i.e., insurance policies not bundled with loans or other kinds of contracts) were invented in Genoa in the 14th century, as were insurance pools backed by pledges of landed estates. The first known insurance contract dates from Genoa in 1347, and in the next century maritime insurance developed widely and premiums were intuitively varied with risks.

These new insurance contracts allowed insurance to be separated from investment, a separation of roles that first proved useful in marine insurance. The first printed book on insurance was the legal treatise On Insurance and Merchants' Bets by Pedro de Santarém (Santerna), written in 1488 and published in 1552.

== Modern insurance ==
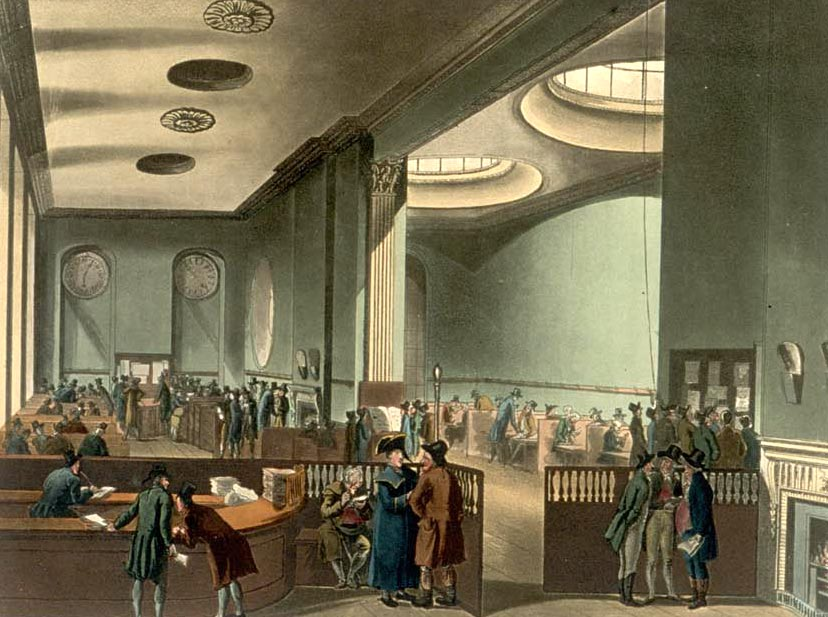
The subscription room at Lloyd's of London in the early 19th century.

Insurance became more sophisticated in Enlightenment era Europe, and specialized varieties developed. Some forms of insurance developed in London in the early decades of the 17th century. For example, the will of the English colonist Robert Hayman mentioned two "policies of insurance" taken out with the diocesan Chancellor of London, Arthur Duck. Of the value of £100 each, one related to the safe arrival of Hayman's ship in Guyana and the other was in regard to "one hundred pounds assured by the said Doctor Arthur Ducke on my life".

=== Property insurance ===
Hamburger Feuerkasse (English: Hamburg Fire Office) in 1676 became the first officially established fire insurance company in the world, and the oldest existing insurance enterprise available to the public.

Property insurance as we know it today can be traced to the Great Fire of London, which in 1666 devoured more than 13,000 houses. The devastating effects of the fire converted the development of insurance "from a matter of convenience into one of urgency, a change of opinion reflected in Sir Christopher Wren's inclusion of a site for 'the Insurance Office' in his new plan for London in 1667". A number of attempted fire insurance schemes came to nothing, but in 1681, economist Nicholas Barbon and eleven associates established the first fire insurance company, the "Insurance Office for Houses", at the back of the Royal Exchange to insure brick and frame homes. Initially, 5,000 homes were insured by his Insurance Office.

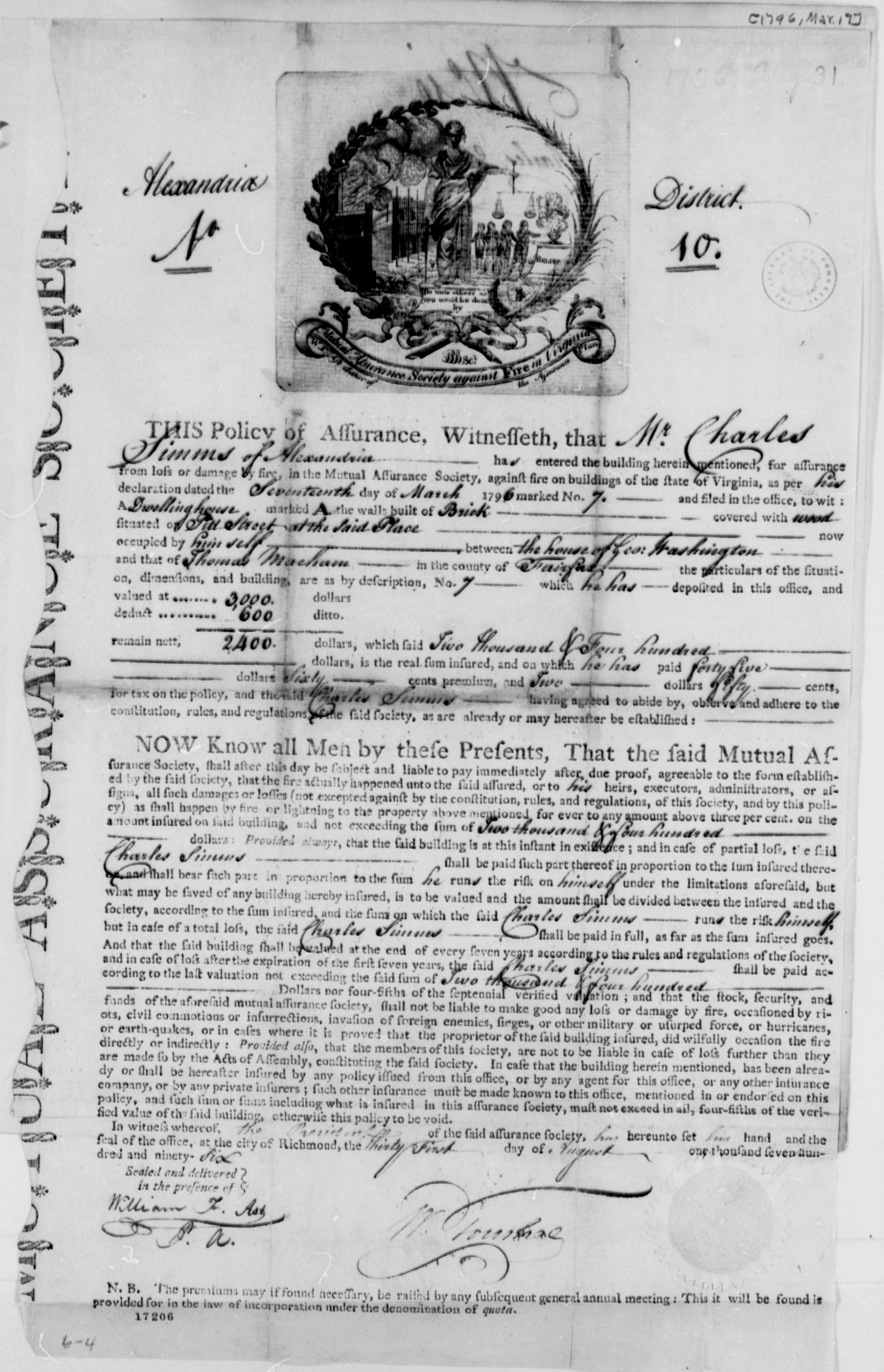
An 18th-century fire insurance contract.

In the wake of this first successful venture, many similar companies were founded in the following decades. Initially, each company employed its own fire department to prevent and minimize the damage from conflagrations on properties insured by them. They also began to issue 'fire insurance marks' to their customers. These would be displayed prominently above the main door of the property and allowed the insurance company to positively identify properties that had taken out insurance with them. One such notable company was the Hand in Hand Fire & Life Insurance Society, founded in 1696 at Tom's Coffee House in St Martin's Lane in London. It was structured as a mutual society, and for 135 years it operated its own fire brigade and played an important part in shaping fire fighting and prevention. The Sun Fire Office is the earliest still existing property insurance company, dating from 1710.

This system was soon exposed as terribly flawed, as rival brigades often ignored burning buildings once they discovered that it had no insurance policy with their company. Eventually, a solution was agreed upon in which all the insurance companies would supply money and equipment to a municipal authority charged with stationing fire prevention assets and firefighters equally around the city to respond to all fires. This did not solve the problem entirely, as the brigades still tended to favor saving insured buildings to those without any insurance at all.

In Colonial America, the first insurance company that underwrote fire insurance was formed in Charles Town (modern-day Charleston), South Carolina in 1732. Benjamin Franklin helped to popularize and make standard the practice of insurance, particularly property insurance to spread the risk of loss from fire, in the form of perpetual insurance. In 1752, he founded the Philadelphia Contributionship for the Insurance of Houses from Loss by Fire. Franklin's company made contributions toward fire prevention. Not only did his company warn against certain fire hazards, but it also refused to insure certain buildings where the risk of fire was too great, such as all wooden houses.

=== Business insurance ===
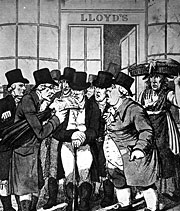
Lloyd's Coffee House was the first marine insurance company.

At the same time, the first insurance schemes for the underwriting of business ventures became available. By the end of the seventeenth century, London's growing importance as a center for trade was increasing demand for marine insurance.

In the late 1680s, Edward Lloyd opened a coffee house on Tower Street in London. This was during a boom of several hundred coffee house gathering places in London, many catering to certain social groupings of clientele. Lloyd's clientele tended to be ship owners, merchants, and ships' captains. This enabled Lloyd's Coffee House to become a reliable source of the latest shipping news. Such news included information about the sinking of ships and other ship/cargo losses. Because of this, Lloyd's became the meeting place for parties in the shipping industry to do business for having their cargoes and ships insured, with those willing to underwrite such ventures. These informal beginnings led to the establishment of the insurance market Lloyd's of London and several related shipping and insurance businesses. In 1774, long after Edward Lloyd's death in 1713, the participating members of the insurance arrangement formed a committee and moved to the Royal Exchange on Cornhill as the Society of Lloyd's. Since its inception, Lloyd's has operated not as an insurance company but as a gathering place of individuals (and more recently, small groups of individuals) issuing insurance policies.

In 1720 the Royal Exchange Assurance Corporation received its royal charter under the Royal Exchange and London Assurance Corporation Act 1719. The act established this corporation as Great Britain's exclusive corporate insurer of marine property but allowed individuals in and outside of the Lloyd's consortium to underwrite insurance if unincorporated. From 1741 to 1750 the corporation was headed by multinational merchant, attorney, and author Nicholas Magens.

Once established, insurance underwriters such as those at Lloyd's gradually over many decades moved into other lines of insurance business. In the same gradual manner, most fire insurers have expanded their scope of business to insure against other causes of building loss with their contents. Many have also filled a need for insuring business and personal liabilities, such as injuries caused by defective products and premises. This range of insurance lines has become a worldwide modern market of property-liability insurance.

=== Life insurance ===
The first life insurance policies were taken out in the early 18th century. The first company to offer life insurance was the Amicable Society for a Perpetual Assurance Office, founded in London in 1706 by William Talbot and Sir Thomas Allen. The first plan of life insurance was that each member paid a fixed annual payment per share on from one to three shares with consideration to age of the members being twelve to fifty-five. At the end of the year a portion of the "amicable contribution" was divided among the wives and children of deceased members and it was in proportion to the amount of shares the heirs owned. Amicable Society started with 2,000 members.

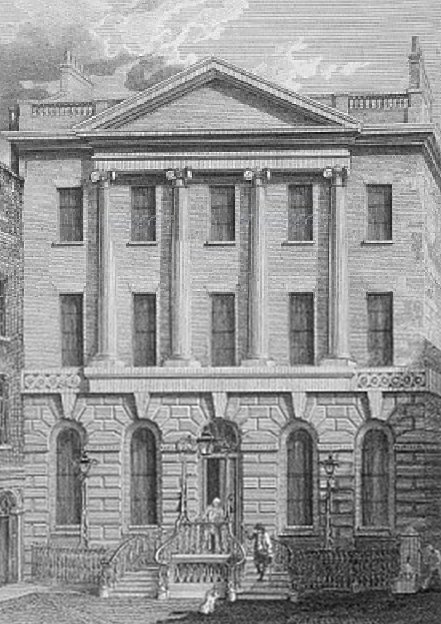
Amicable Society for a Perpetual Assurance Office, established in 1706, was the first life insurance company in the world.

The first life table was written by Edmund Halley in 1693, but it was only in the 1750s that the necessary mathematical and statistical tools were in place for the development of modern life insurance. James Dodson, a mathematician and actuary, tried to establish a new company that issued premiums aimed at correctly offsetting the risks of long term life assurance policies, after being refused admission to the Amicable Life Assurance Society because of his advanced age. He was unsuccessful in his attempts at procuring a charter from the government before his death in 1757.

His disciple, Edward Rowe Mores was finally able to establish the Society for Equitable Assurances on Lives and Survivorship in 1762. It was the world's first mutual insurer and it pioneered age based premiums based on mortality rate laying "the framework for scientific insurance practice and development" and "the basis of modern life assurance upon which all life assurance schemes were subsequently based".

Mores also specified that the chief official should be called an actuary—the earliest known reference to the position as a business concern. The first modern actuary was William Morgan, who was appointed in 1775 and served until 1830. In 1776 the Society carried out the first actuarial valuation of liabilities and subsequently distributed the first reversionary bonus (1781) and interim bonus (1809) among its members. It also used regular valuations to balance competing interests. The society sought to treat its members equitably and the directors tried to ensure that the policyholders received a fair return on their respective investments. Premiums were regulated according to age, and anybody could be admitted regardless of their state of health and other circumstances.

The sale of life insurance in the U.S. began in the late 1760s. The Presbyterian Synods in Philadelphia and New York founded the Corporation for Relief of Poor and Distressed Widows and Children of Presbyterian Ministers in 1759; Episcopalian priests created a comparable relief fund in 1769. Between 1787 and 1837 more than two dozen life insurance companies were started, but fewer than half a dozen survived.

=== Accident insurance ===
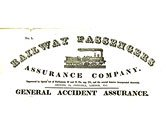
The Railway Passengers Assurance Company was founded in 1848 as the first company to provide accident insurance.

In the late 19th century, "accident insurance" began to become available. This operated much like modern disability insurance. The first company to offer accident insurance was the Railway Passengers Assurance Company, formed in 1848 in England to insure against the rising number of fatalities on the nascent railway system. It was registered as the Universal Casualty Compensation Company to:

...grant assurances on the lives of persons traveling by railway and to grant, in cases, of an accident not having a fatal termination, compensation to the assured for injuries received under certain conditions.

The company was able to reach an agreement with the railway companies, whereby basic accident insurance would be sold as a package deal along with travel tickets to customers. The company charged higher premiums for second and third class travel due to the higher risk of injury in the roofless carriages.

=== Germany ===
By the late 19th century, governments began to initiate national insurance programs against sickness and old age. Germany built on a tradition of welfare programs in Prussia and Saxony that began as early as in the 1840s. In the 1880s Chancellor Otto von Bismarck introduced old age pensions, accident insurance and medical care that formed the basis for Germany's welfare state. His paternalistic programs won the support of German industry because its goals were to win the support of the working classes for the Empire and reduce the outflow of immigrants to America, where wages were higher but welfare did not exist.

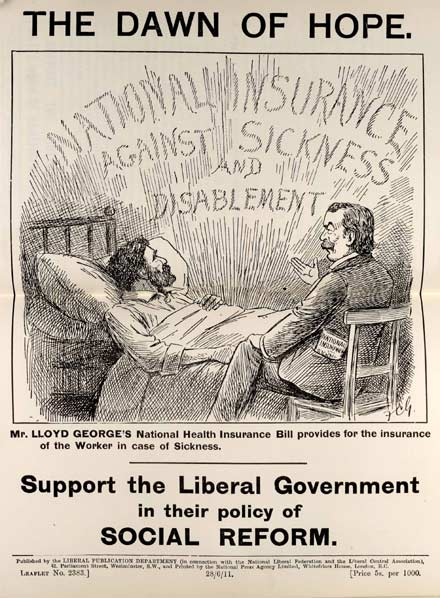
The Liberal Party under David Lloyd George (right) boasts of passing the National Insurance Act of 1911

=== Great Britain ===
In Britain more extensive legislation was introduced by the Liberal government, led by H. H. Asquith and David Lloyd George. The National Insurance Act 1911 gave the British working classes the first contributory system of insurance against illness and unemployment.

All workers who earned under £160 a year had to pay 4 pence a week to the scheme; the employer paid 3 pence, and general taxation paid 2 pence. As a result, workers could take sick leave and be paid 10 shillings a week for the first 13 weeks and 5 shillings a week for the next 13 weeks. Workers also gained access to free treatment for tuberculosis, and the sick were eligible for treatment by a panel doctor. The National Insurance Act also provided maternity benefits. Time-limited unemployment benefit was based on actuarial principles and it was planned that it would be funded by a fixed amount each from workers, employers, and taxpayers. It was restricted to particular industries, cyclical/seasonal industries like construction of ships, and neither made any provision for dependants. By 1913, 2.3 million were insured under the scheme for unemployment benefit and almost 15 million insured for sickness benefit.

This system was greatly expanded after the Second World War under the influence of the Beveridge Report, to form the first modern welfare state.

=== United States ===
The World War Adjusted Compensation Act, or Bonus Act, was a United States federal law passed on May 19, 1924, that granted a life insurance policy to veterans of military service in World War I. It led to the Bonus Army of 1932 when veterans demanded immediate payment of the policy. They were forcibly removed by the Army from protest sites around Washington D.C. They were finally paid in 1936 by the Adjusted Compensation Payment Act

In the United States, until 1935, the federal government did not mandate any form of insurance upon the nation as a whole. However there had been generous benefits for military veterans, and this became a model for the American welfare state.

The passage of the New Deal's 1935 Social Security Act expanded the concept and acceptance of insurance as a means to achieve the individual financial security for all older workers. That expansion experienced its first boom market immediately after the World War II. With the original G.I. Bill of 1944 came large-scale programs that greatly expanded the ideal that educational expenses and affordable housing mortgages were benefits of having served. The mortgages that were underwritten by the federal government during this time included an insurance clause as a means of protecting the banks and lending institutions involved against avoidable losses. During the 1940s there was also the GI life insurance policy program that was designed to ease the burden of military losses on the civilian population and survivors.
