= Marine insurance =

Insurance covering the loss of ships and other transport

Marine insurance covers the physical loss or damage of ships, cargo, terminals, and any transport by which the property is transferred, acquired, or held between the points of origin and the final destination. Cargo insurance is a sub-branch of marine insurance, though marine insurance also includes onshore and offshore exposed property, (container terminals, ports, oil platforms, pipelines), hull, marine casualty, and marine losses. When goods are transported by mail or courier or related post, shipping insurance is used instead.

== History ==
In December 1901 and January 1902, at the direction of archaeologist Jacques de Morgan, Father Jean-Vincent Scheil found a 2.25-metre (89 in) tall basalt or diorite stele in three pieces inscribed with 4,130 lines of cuneiform law dictated by Hammurabi (c. 1792–1750 BC) of the First Babylonian Empire in the city of Shush, Iran. Code of Hammurabi Law 100 stipulated repayment by a debtor of a loan to a creditor on a schedule with a maturity date specified in written contractual terms. Laws 101 and 102 stipulated that a shipping agent, factor, or ship charterer was only required to repay the principal of a loan to their creditor in the event of a net income loss or a total loss due to an Act of God. Law 103 stipulated that an agent, factor, or charterer was by force majeure relieved of their liability for an entire loan in the event that the agent, factor, or charterer was the victim of theft during the term of their charterparty upon provision of an affidavit of the theft to their creditor.

Code of Hammurabi Law 104 stipulated that a carrier (agents, factors, or charterers) issue a waybill and invoice for a contract of carriage to a consignee outlining contractual terms for sales, commissions, and laytime and receive a bill of parcel and lien authorizing consignment from the consignee. Law 105 stipulated that claims for losses filed by agents, factors, and charterers without receipts were without standing. Law 126 stipulated that filing a false claim of a loss was punishable by law. Law 235 stipulated that a shipbuilder was liable within one year of construction for the replacement of an unseaworthy vessel to the ship-owner that was lost during the term of a charterparty. Laws 236 and 237 stipulated that a sea captain, ship-manager, or charterer was liable for the replacement of a lost vessel and cargo to the shipowner and consignees respectively that was negligently operated during the term of a charterparty. Law 238 stipulated that a captain, manager, or charterer that saved a ship from total loss was only required to pay one-half the value of the ship to the shipowner. Law 240 stipulated that the owner of a cargo ship that destroyed a passenger ship in a collision was liable for replacement of the passenger ship and cargo it held upon provision of an affidavit of the collision by the owner of the passenger ship.

In the Digesta seu Pandectae (533), the second volume of the codification of laws ordered by Justinian I (527–565) of the Eastern Roman Empire, a legal opinion written by the Roman jurist Paulus at the beginning of the Crisis of the Third Century in 235 AD was included about the Lex Rhodia ("Rhodian law") that articulates the general average principle of marine insurance established on the island of Rhodes in approximately 1000 to 800 BC as a member of the Doric Hexapolis, plausibly by the Phoenicians during the proposed Dorian invasion and emergence of the purported Sea Peoples during the Greek Dark Ages (c. 1100 – c. 750) that led to the proliferation of the Doric Greek dialect. The law of general average constitutes the fundamental principle that underlies all insurance.

The oldest hedging instruments to mitigate risk in medieval times were sea/marine (Mutuum) loans, commenda contract, and bill of exchanges. Separate marine insurance contracts were developed near Genoa, in Camogli in 1853 and other Italian cities in the fourteenth century and spread to northern Europe. Premiums varied with intuitive estimates of the variable risk from seasons and pirates. Modern marine insurance law originated in the Lex mercatoria (law merchant). In 1601, a specialized chamber of assurance separate from the other Courts was established in England. By the end of the seventeenth century, London's growing importance as a centre for trade was increasing demand for marine insurance. In the late 1680s, Edward Lloyd opened a coffee house on Tower Street in London. It soon became a popular haunt for ship owners, merchants, and ships' captains, and thereby a reliable source of the latest shipping news.

Lloyd's Coffee House was the first marine insurance market. It became the meeting place for parties in the shipping industry wishing to insure cargoes and ships, and those willing to underwrite such ventures. These informal beginnings led to the establishment of the insurance market Lloyd's of London and several related shipping and insurance businesses. The participating members of the insurance arrangement eventually formed a committee and moved to the Royal Exchange on Cornhill as the Society of Lloyd's. The establishment of insurance companies, a developing infrastructure of specialists (such as shipbrokers, admiralty lawyers, bankers, surveyors, loss adjusters, general average adjusters, et al.), and the growth of the British Empire gave English law a prominence in this area which it largely maintains and forms the basis of almost all modern practice. Lord Mansfield, Lord Chief Justice in the mid-eighteenth century, began the merging of law merchant and common law principles. The growth of the London insurance market led to the standardization of policies and judicial precedent further developed marine insurance law. In 1906 the Marine Insurance Act codified the previous common law; it is both an extremely thorough and concise piece of work. Although the title of the Act refers to marine insurance, the general principles have been applied to all non-life insurance. In the 19th century, Lloyd's and the Institute of London Underwriters (a grouping of London company insurers) developed between them standardized clauses for the use of marine insurance, and these have been maintained since. These are known as the Institute Clauses because the Institute covered the cost of their publication. Out of marine insurance, grew non-marine insurance and reinsurance. Marine insurance traditionally formed the majority of business underwritten at Lloyd's. Nowadays, Marine insurance is often grouped with Aviation and Transit (cargo) risks, and in this form is known by the acronym 'MAT'.

It is common for marine insurance agencies to compete with the offerings provided by local insurers. These specialist agencies often fill market gaps by providing cover for hard-to-place or obscure marine insurance risks that would otherwise be difficult or impossible to find insurance cover for. These agencies can become quite large and eventually become market makers. They operate best when their day-to-day management is independent of the insurers who provide them with the capital to underwrite risks on their behalf.

As of 2024, the Nordic region (represented by Cefor) received the largest share of marine hull insurance premiums with 12.9% of the world market, followed by China at 11.6% and Lloyd's of London third at 8.7%, according to the International Union of Marine Insurance.

== Practice ==
The Marine Insurance Act includes, as a schedule, a standard policy (known as the "SG form"), which parties were at liberty to use if they wished. Because each term in the policy had been tested through at least two centuries of judicial precedent, the policy was extremely thorough. However, it was also expressed in rather archaic terms. In 1991, the London market produced a new standard policy wording known as the MAR 91 form using the Institute Clauses. The MAR form is simply a general statement of insurance; the Institute Clauses are used to set out the detail of the insurance cover. In practice, the policy document usually consists of the MAR form used as a cover, with the Clauses stapled to the inside. Typically, each clause will be stamped, with the stamp overlapping both onto the inside cover and to other clauses; this practice is used to avoid the substitution or removal of clauses. Because marine insurance is typically underwritten on a subscription basis, the MAR form begins: We, the Underwriters, agree to bind ourselves each for his own part and not one for another [...]. In legal terms, liability under the policy is several and not joint, i.e., the underwriters are all liable together, but only for their share or proportion of the risk. If one underwriter should default, the remainder are not liable to pick his share of the claim. Typically, marine insurance is split between the vessels and the cargo. Insurance of the vessels is generally known as "Hull and Machinery" (H&M). A more restricted form of cover is "Total Loss Only" (TLO), generally used as a reinsurance, which only covers the total loss of the vessel and not any partial loss. Cover may be on either a "voyage" or "time" basis. The "voyage" basis covers transit between the ports set out in the policy; the "time" basis covers a period, typically one year, and is more common.

== Protection and indemnity ==
A marine policy typically covered only three-quarter of the insured's liabilities towards third parties (Institute Time Clauses Hulls 1.10.83). The typical liabilities arise in respect of collision with another ship, known as "running down" (collision with a fixed object is an "allision"), and wreck removal (a wreck may serve to block a harbour, for example). In the 19th century, shipowners banded together in mutual underwriting clubs known as Protection and Indemnity Clubs (P&I), to insure the remaining one-quarter liability amongst themselves. These Clubs are still in existence today and have become the model for other specialized and noncommercial marine and non-marine mutuals, for example in relation to oil pollution and nuclear risks. Clubs work on the basis of agreeing to accept a shipowner as a member and levying an initial "call" (premium). With the fund accumulated, reinsurance will be purchased; however, if the loss experience is unfavourable one or more "supplementary calls" may be made. Clubs also typically try to build up reserves, but this puts them at odds with their mutual status. Because liability regimes vary throughout the world, insurers are usually careful to limit or exclude American Jones Act liability.

== Actual total loss and constructive total loss ==
These two terms are used to differentiate the degree of proof that a vessel or cargo has been lost. An actual total loss occurs when the property has been destroyed, or so damaged as to cease to be a thing of the kind insured. A constructive total loss is a situation in which the cost of repairs plus the cost of salvage equal or exceed the value. The use of these terms is contingent on there being property remaining to assess damages, which is not always possible in losses to ships at sea or in total theft situations. In this respect, marine insurance differs from non-marine insurance, with which the insured is required to prove the loss. Traditionally, in law, marine insurance was seen as an insurance of "the adventure", with insurers having a stake and an interest in the vessel and/or the cargo rather than simply an interest in the financial consequences of the subject-matter's survival.

=== Constructive total loss ===
The term "constructive total loss", or CTL, was used by the United States Navy during and after World War II to describe naval vessels that were damaged to such an extent that they were beyond economical repair. This was most often applied to small-type ships (destroyer, patrol boats, landing ships, mine warfare vessels, etc.) in 1945, the last year of the war, many of which were damaged by kamikazes; postwar the term was also used for ships damaged in typhoons. By this time enough ships were available for the war that some could be disposed of if severely damaged.

== General averages ==
Average in marine insurance terms is "an equitable apportionment among all the interested parties of such an expense or loss".

General average stands apart for marine insurance. In order for general average to be properly declared, 1) there must be an event which is beyond the shipowner's control, which imperils the entire adventure; 2) there must be a voluntary sacrifice, 3) there must be something saved. The voluntary sacrifice might be the jettison of certain cargo, the use of tugs, or salvors, or damage to the ship, be it, voluntary grounding, knowingly working the engines that will result in damages. General average requires all parties concerned in the maritime venture (hull/cargo/freight/bunkers) to contribute to make good the voluntary sacrifice. They share the expense in proportion to the 'value at risk" in the adventure. Particular average is the term applied to partial loss be it hull or cargo.

Average – is the situation in which the insured has under-insured, i.e., insured an item for less than it is worth. Average will apply to reduce the claim amount payable. An average adjuster is a marine claims specialist responsible for adjusting and providing the general average statement. An Average Adjuster in North America is a 'member of the association of Average Adjusters' To ensure the fairness of the adjustment a General Average adjuster is appointed by the shipowner and paid by the insurer.

== Excess, deductible, retention, co-insurance, and franchise ==
An excess is the amount payable by the insured and is usually expressed as the first amount falling due, up to a ceiling, in the event of a loss. An excess may or may not be applied. It may be expressed in either monetary or percentage terms. An excess is typically used to discourage moral hazard and to remove small claims, which are disproportionately expensive to handle. The term "excess" signifies the "deductible" or "retention".

A co-insurance, which typically governs non-proportional treaty reinsurance, is an excess expressed as a proportion of a claim in percentage terms and applied to the entirety of a claim. Co-insurance is a penalty imposed on the insured by the insurance carrier for under reporting/declaring/insuring the value of tangible property or business income. The penalty is based on a percentage stated within the policy and the amount under reported. As an example: a vessel actually valued at $1,000,000 has an 80% co-insurance clause but is insured for only $750,000. Since its insured value is less than 80% of its actual value, when it suffers a loss, the insurance payout will be subject to the under-reporting penalty, the insured will receive 750000/1000000th (75%) of the claim made less the deductible.

== Tonners and chinamen ==
These are both obsolete forms of early reinsurance. Both are technically unlawful, as not having insurable interest, and so were unenforceable in law. Policies were typically marked P.P.I. (Policy is Proof of Interest). Their use continued into the 1970s before they were banned by Lloyd's, the main market, by which time they had become nothing more than crude bets. A "tonner" was simply a "policy" setting out the global gross tonnage loss for a year. If that loss was reached or exceeded, the policy paid out. A "chinaman" applied the same principle but in reverse: thus, if the limit was not reached, the policy paid out.

== Specialist policies ==
Various specialist policies exist, including:

- Newbuilding risks: This covers the risk of damage to the hull while it is under construction.
- Open Cargo or Shipper's Interest Insurance: This policy may be purchased by a carrier, freight broker, or shipper, as coverage for the shipper's goods. In the event of loss or damage, this type of insurance will pay for the true value of the shipment, rather than only the legal amount that the carrier is liable for.
- Annual Cover: is issued for twelve month period subject to at inception of a minimum deposit premium. Often used by regular shippers of goods such as importers and exporters including freight forwarding agents, where a policy is issued to cover a number of consignments being shipped to and from various ports and destinations throughout the year
- Yacht Insurance: Insurance of pleasure craft is generally known as "yacht insurance" and includes liability coverage. Smaller vessels such as yachts and fishing vessels are typically underwritten on a "binding authority" or "line slip" basis.
- War risks: General hull insurance does not cover the risks of a vessel sailing into a war zone. A typical example is the risk to a tanker sailing in the Persian Gulf during the Gulf War. The war risks areas are established by the London-based Joint War Committee.
- Increased Value (IV): Increased Value cover protects the shipowner against any difference between the insured value of the vessel and the market value of the vessel.
- Overdue insurance: This is a form of insurance now largely obsolete due to advances in communications. It was an early form of reinsurance and was bought by an insurer when a ship was late at arriving at her destination port and there was a risk that she might have been lost (but, equally, might simply have been delayed). The overdue insurance of the Titanic was famously underwritten on the doorstep of Lloyd's.
- Cargo insurance: Cargo insurance is underwritten on the Institute Cargo Clauses, with coverage on an A, B, or C basis, A having the widest cover and C the most restricted. Valuable cargo is known as specie. Institute Clauses also exist for the insurance of specific types of cargo, such as frozen food, frozen meat, and particular commodities such as bulk oil, coal, and jute. Often these insurance conditions are developed for a specific group as is the case with the Institute Federation of Oils, Seeds and Fats Associations (FOFSA) Trades Clauses which have been agreed with the Federation of Oils, Seeds and Fats Associations and Institute Commodity Trades Clauses which are used for the insurance of shipments of cocoa, coffee, cotton, fats and oils, hides and skins, metals, oil seeds, refined sugar, and tea and have been agreed with the Federation of Commodity Associations. There has also been discussion about insurance policies to address plastic pollution as a result of plastic cargo losses at sea. For example, marine insurance policies should factor in liability for marine plastic pollution, marine clean-up and conservation.

== Warranties and conditions ==
A peculiarity of marine insurance, and insurance law generally, is the use of the terms condition and warranty. In English law, a condition typically describes a part of the contract that is fundamental to the performance of that contract, and, if breached, the non-breaching party is entitled not only to claim damages but to terminate the contract on the basis that it has been repudiated by the party in breach.

By contrast, a warranty is not fundamental to the performance of the contract and breach of a warranty, while giving rise to a claim for damages, does not entitle the non-breaching party to terminate the contract. The meaning of these terms is reversed in insurance law. Indeed, a warranty if not strictly complied with will automatically discharge the insurer from further liability under the contract of insurance. The assured has no defense to his breach, unless he can prove that the insurer, by his conduct, has waived his right to invoke the breach, possibility provided in section 34(3) of the Marine Insurance Act 1906 (MIA). Furthermore, in the absence of express warranties the MIA will imply them, notably a warranty to provide a seaworthy vessel at the commencement of the voyage in a voyage policy (section 39(1)) and a warranty of legality of the insured voyage (section 41).

== Salvage and prizes ==
The term "salvage" refers to the practice of rendering aid to a vessel in distress. Apart from the consideration that the sea is traditionally "a place of safety", with sailors honour-bound to render assistance as required, it is obviously in underwriters' interests to encourage assistance to vessels in danger of being wrecked. A policy will usually include a "sue and labour" clause which will cover the reasonable costs incurred by a shipowner in his avoiding a greater loss.

At sea, a ship in distress will typically agree to "Lloyd's Open Form" with any potential salvor. The Lloyd's Open Form (LOF) is the standard contract, although other forms exist. The Lloyd's Open Form is headed "No cure — no pay"; the intention being that if the attempted salvage is unsuccessful, no award will be made. However, this principle has been weakened in recent years, and awards are now permitted in cases where, although the ship might have sunk, pollution has been avoided or mitigated.

In other circumstances the "salvor" may invoke the SCOPIC terms (most recent and commonly used rendition is SCOPIC 2000) in contrast to the LOF these terms mean that the salvor will be paid even if the salvage attempt is unsuccessful. The amount the salvor receives is limited to cover the costs of the salvage attempt and 25% above it. One of the main negative factors in invoking SCOPIC (on the salvor's behalf) is if the salvage attempt is successful the amount at which the salvor can claim under article 13 of LOF is discounted.

The Lloyd's Open Form, once agreed, allows salvage attempts to begin immediately. The extent of any award is determined later; although the standard wording refers to the Chairman of Lloyd's arbitrating any award, in practice the role of arbitrator is passed to specialist admiralty QCs. A ship captured in war is referred to as a prize, and the captors entitled to prize money. Again, this risk is covered by standard policies.

== Claims basis and deductibles ==
Marine insurance is always written on an occurrence basis, covering claims that arise out of damage or injury that took place during the policy period, regardless when claims are made. Policy features often include extensions of coverage for items typical to a marine business such as liability for container damage and removal of debris.

A deductible is the first amount of a claim that the policy holders bears themselves. There can occasionally be a zero deductible but in most cases a deductible applies to claims made under a policy of marine insurance.

== See also ==
- CEFOR
- History of insurance
- Classification society
- Legal definitions of wreckage
- Inland marine insurance
- Seaworthiness (law)
