= Air waybill =

Receipt issued by international airlines

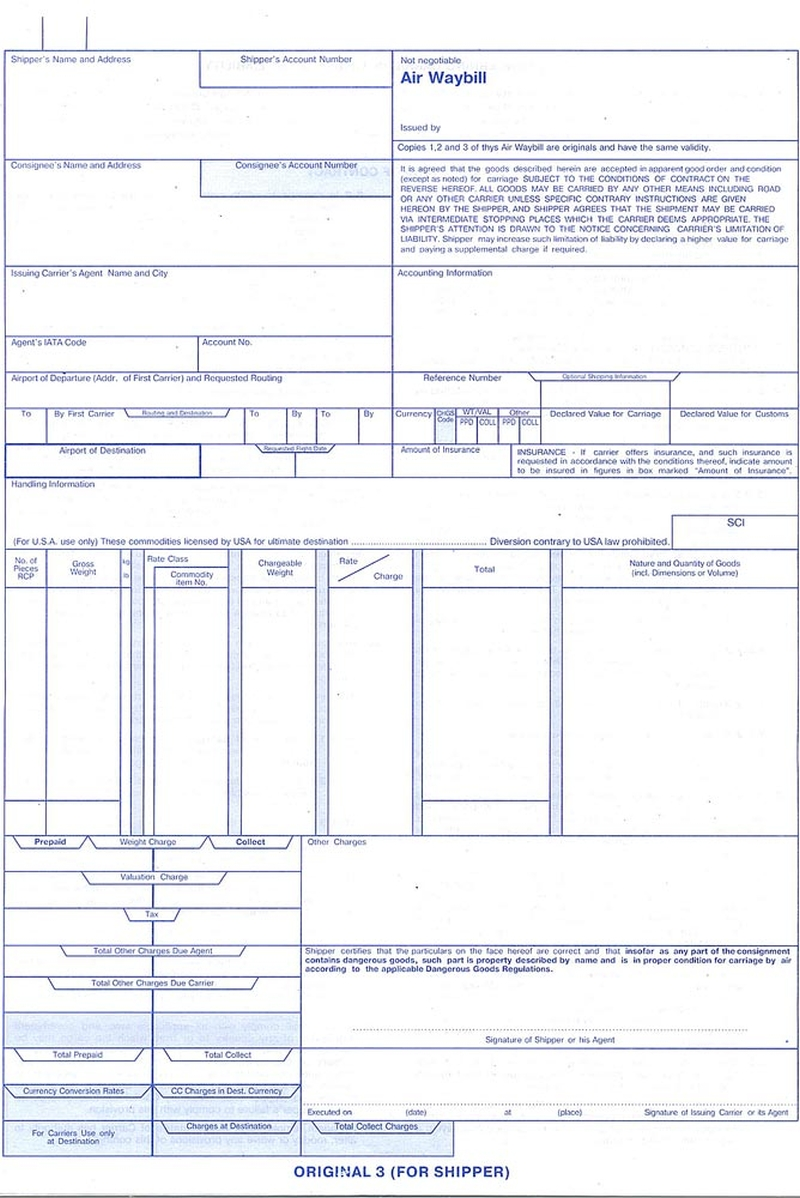
An air waybill

An air waybill (AWB) or air consignment note is a receipt issued by an international airline for goods and an evidence of the contract of carriage. It is not a document of title to the goods. The air waybill is non-negotiable.

== Description ==
The air waybill is the most important document issued by a carrier either directly or through its authorized agent. It is a non-negotiable transport document that covers the transport of cargo from airport to airport. An air waybill (AWB), also known as an air consignment note, is a type of bill of lading. By accepting a shipment, an IATA cargo agent is acting on behalf of the carrier whose air waybill is issued.

Air waybills have eleven digit numbers, called AWB numbers, which can be used to make bookings, check the status of delivery, and a current position of the shipment.

Air waybills are issued in eight sets of different colours. The first three copies are classified as originals. The first original, green in colour, is the issuing carrier's copy. The second, coloured pink, is the consignee's copy. The third, coloured blue, is the shipper's copy. A fourth yellow copy acts as the Delivery Receipt or proof of delivery. The other four copies are white.

== Functions ==
The main functions of an air waybill are:

- Contract of Carriage: Behind every original of the Air Waybill are conditions of contract for carriage documents.
- Evidence of Receipt of Goods: When the shipper delivers goods to be forwarded, he will get a receipt. The receipt is proof that the shipment was handed over in good order and condition and also that the shipping instructions, as contained in the Shipper's Letter of Instructions, are acceptable. After completion, an original copy of the air waybill is given to the shipper as evidence of the acceptance of goods and as proof of contract of carriage
- Freight Bill: The air waybill may be used as a bill or invoice together with supporting documents since it may indicate charges to be paid by the consignee, charges due to the agent or the carrier. An original copy of the air waybill is used for the carrier's accounting
- Certificate of Insurance: The air waybill may also serve as an evidence if the carrier is in a position to ensure the shipment and is requested to do so by the shipper.
- Customs declaration: Although customs authorities require various documents like a commercial invoice, packing list, etc. the air waybill too is proof of the freight amount billed for the goods carried and may be needed to be presented for customs clearance

The format of the air waybill has been designed by IATA and these can be used for both domestic as well as international transportation. These are available in two forms, viz. the airline logo equipped air waybill and the neutral air waybill.

Usually, airline air waybills are distributed to IATA cargo agents by IATA airlines. An air waybill shows:

- the carrier's name
- its head office address
- its logo
- the pre-printed eleven digit air waybill number

It is also possible to complete an air waybill through a computerized system. IATA's e-Air Waybill (e-AWB) programme and multilateral e-AWB Agreement remove the requirement for an air waybill to be issued as a paper document and therefore allow for electronic air waybill documentation. Agents all over the world are now using their own in-house computer systems to issue airlines' and freight forwarders' own air waybills. IATA cargo agents usually hold air waybills of several carriers. However, it gradually became difficult to accommodate these pre-numbered air waybills with the printed identification in the computer system. Therefore, a neutral air waybill was created. Both types of air waybills have the same format and layout. However, the neutral air waybill does not bear any pre-printed individual name, head office address, logo and serial number.

== Validity ==
An air waybill is a contract—an agreement enforceable by commercial law. To become a valid contract it has to be signed by the shipper or his agent and by the carrier or its authorized agent. Although the same individual or organisation may act on behalf of both the carrier and the shipper, the air waybill must be signed twice one each in the respective carrier and shipper boxes. Both signatures may be of the same person. This also implies that the air waybill should be issued immediately upon receipt of the goods and letter in instructions from the shipper.

As long as the air waybill is neither dated nor signed twice, the goods do not fall within the terms of the conditions of the contract and therefore the carrier will not accept any responsibility for the goods. The validity of the air waybill and thus the contract of carriage expires upon delivery of the shipment to the consignee (or his authorized agent).

== Responsibility for completion ==
The air waybill is a contract—an agreement between the shipper and the carrier. The agent only acts as an intermediary between the shipper and carrier. The air waybill is also a contract of good faith. This means that the shipper will be responsible for the haul also be liable for all the damage suffered by the airline or any person due to irregularity, incorrectness or incompleteness of insertions on the air waybill, even if the air waybill has been completed by an agent or the carrier on his behalf, except when the shipper (as vendor) has delivered the goods to a purchaser (consignee) on an Ex Works basis, and the agent has been hired by the consignee to act in its name as contracting carrier, and responsible for overseeing the regularity, correctness or completeness of the air waybill, pursuant to the freight terms and conditions agreed between the consignee and the agent (as contracting carrier), including, without limitation, whether the freight is NVD (Non Value Declared) or VD (Value Declared). When the agent acts in such conditions, the agent shall be liable for the haul and all the damage suffered by the consignee due to irregularity, incorrectness or incompleteness of insertions on the air waybill (when the shipper includes freight on the purchased item, in any other Incoterms sale, the shipper is the sole responsible, since there will be no agent acting on behalf of the consignee for the relevant freight).

When the shipper signs the AWB or issues the letter of instructions he simultaneously confirms his agreement to the conditions of contract.

== Non-negotiable ==
Waybills are non-negotiable documents, unlike bills of lading, which are usually negotiable. The words "non-negotiable" are printed clearly at the top of the air waybill. This means that the air waybill is a receipt for goods and a contract for transportation only and does not transfer ownership of merchandise mentioned in the box "nature and quantity of goods". An ocean bill of lading, if consigned "to order of" the consignee and negotiated, may transfer ownership of the goods and must be endorsed by the party ultimately accepting the goods. Although the AWB is a non-negotiable document, it can be used as a means of receiving payment. This can be done through the intermediation of a bank when the payment is by means of a letter of credit. An air waybill executed according to the terms of the letter of credit allows the shipper to present the shipper's copy of the air waybill to the bank, with an invoice and other documents stipulated in the letter of credit, and collect the billed value of the shipped goods from the bank. The amount paid by the bank to the shipper will be debited to the bank's customer who ordered the goods and arranged for the issuance of the letter of credit.

The goods in the air consignment are consigned directly to the party (the consignee) named in the letter of credit (L/C). Unless the goods are consigned to a third party like the issuing bank, the importer can obtain the goods from the carrier at destination without paying the issuing bank or the consignor. Therefore, unless a cash payment has been received by the shipper or the buyer's integrity is unquestionable, consigning goods directly to the importer is risky. If a letter of credit is used, this risk is intermediated by the bank.

For air consignment to certain destinations, it is possible to arrange payment on a COD (cash on delivery) basis and consign the goods directly to the importer. The goods are released to the importer only after the importer makes the payment and complies with the instructions in the AWB.

In air freight, the exporter (the shipper) often engages a freight forwarder or consolidator to handle the forwarding of goods. The shipper provides a Shipper's Letter of Instructions that authorizes the forwarding agent to sign certain documents (e.g. the AWB) on behalf of the shipper.

The air waybill must indicate that the goods have been accepted for carriage, and it must be signed or authenticated by the carrier or the named agent for or on behalf of the carrier. The signature or authentication of the carrier must be identified as carrier, and in the case of agent signing or authenticating, the name and the capacity of the carrier on whose behalf the agent signs or authenticates must be indicated.

International air waybills that contain consolidated cargo are called master air waybills (MAWB). MAWBs have additional papers called house air waybills (HAWB). Each HAWB contains information of each individual shipment (consignee, contents, etc.) within the consolidation. International AWBs that are not consolidated (only one shipment in one bill) are called simple AWBs. A house air waybill can also be created by a freight forwarder. When the shipment is booked, the airline issues a MAWB to the forwarder, who in turn issues their own house air waybill to their customer.

== House Waybill (HAWB) vs Master Air Waybill (MAWB) ==
=== House Air Waybill (HAWB) ===
House air waybill (HAWB) is a transport document, which is used in air shipments, issued and signed by a freight forwarder, generally on a natural air waybill format, evidences the terms and conditions of the carriage of goods as specified by the freight forwarder.

Neutral air waybills, without pre-printed identification of the issuing carrier can be used to issuance of house air waybills.

The Main Features of a House Air Waybill (HAWB):

- House air waybill generally issued on a natural air waybill format.
- House air waybill issued and signed by a forwarder without indicating any signing authority either carrier or as agent of the carrier.
- A house air waybill (HAWB) may or may not be subject to IATA Rules and one of the international air conventions (Warsaw Convention, Hague amendment, Montreal Convention, etc.)
- House air waybill is signed by the forwarder and states the terms and conditions of carriage for the forwarder company’s perspective. House air waybill does not contain actual carrier’s carriage contract, as a result shipper stated on the house air waybill is not the direct participant of the carriage contract indicated on the master air waybill.

=== Master Air Waybill (MAWB) ===
Master air waybill (MAWB) is a transport document, which is used in air shipments, issued and signed by the air cargo carrier or its agent, generally on a pre-printed carrier’s air waybill format, evidences the terms and conditions of the carriage of goods over routes of the carrier(s).

Master waybills can also be identified as an airline air waybills, with pre-printed issuing carrier identification.

Main Features of a Master Air Waybill (MAWB):

- Master air waybill generally issued on a pre-printed air waybill form of an issuer carrier.
- Master air waybill issued and signed by the carrier or an agent on behalf of the carrier.
- A master air waybill (MAWB) is subject to IATA Rules and one of the international air conventions (Warsaw Convention, Hague amendment, Montreal Convention, etc.)
- Master air waybill is signed by the actual carrier and states the terms and conditions of the carriage, as a result consignee may have protection in case the goods are damaged or lost in transit.

== Air Waybill Number ==
The AWB number has 11 digits and 3 parts.

- The first 3 digits are the Airline Prefix
- The next 7 digits is the Serial Number of the AWB
- The last digit is the Check digit
  - The check digit is derived by dividing the 7 digit Serial Number by 7. The remainder determines the Check Digit. Example: Serial Number 8114074 divided by 7 is 1159153 with remainder 3. To easily calculate the remainder you can divide the 7 figures by 7, then subtract it with its integer, i.e. 8114074 divided by 7 = 1159153.428571429; 1159153.428571429 - 1159153 = 0.428571429; multiply the result by 7 and you will get the check digit by rounding it up or down to its closest integer. Here 0.428571429 x 7 = 3.000.... therefore the Serial Number + Check Digit is 81140743.

== See also ==
- Airline ticket
- Bill of lading
- Bill of sale
- Tracking number
- Waybill
