= Materials management =

Material management supply chain

Materials management is a core supply chain function and includes supply chain planning and supply chain execution capabilities. Specifically, materials management is the capability firms use to plan total material requirements. The material requirements are communicated to procurement and other functions for sourcing. Materials management is also responsible for determining the amount of material to be deployed at each stocking location across the supply chain, establishing material replenishment plans, determining inventory levels to hold for each type of inventory (raw material, WIP, finished goods), and communicating information regarding material needs throughout the extended supply chain.

== Supply chain materials management areas of concentration ==
=== Goals ===
The goal of materials management is to provide an unbroken chain of components for production to manufacture goods on time for customers. The materials department is charged with releasing materials to a supply base, ensuring that the materials are delivered on time to the company using the correct carrier. Materials is generally measured by accomplishing on time delivery to the customer, on time delivery from the supply base, attaining a freight, budget, inventory shrink management, and inventory accuracy. The materials department is also charged with the responsibility of managing new launches.

In some companies materials management is also charged with the procurement of materials by establishing and managing a supply base. In other companies the procurement and management of the supply base is the responsibility of a separate purchasing department. The purchasing department is then responsible for the purchased price variances from the supply base.

In large companies with multitudes of customer changes to the final product there may be a separate logistics department that is responsible for all new acquisition launches and customer changes. This logistics department ensures that the launch materials are procured for production and then transfers the responsibility to the plant materials management.

=== Materials management ===
The major challenge that materials managers face is maintaining a consistent flow of materials for production. There are many factors that inhibit the accuracy of inventory which results in production shortages, premium freight, and often inventory adjustments.

The major issues that all materials managers face are incorrect bills of materials, inaccurate cycle counts, unreported scrap, shipping errors, receiving errors, and production reporting errors. Materials managers have striven to determine how to manage these issues in the business sectors of manufacturing since the beginning of the Industrial Revolution.

== Materials management in construction ==
Materials typically account for a large portion of a construction project's budget. Materials may account for more than 70% of a construction project's cost. Despite these statistics, when project budgets and efficiency are considered, labour and cost reduction are discussed. Materials management often gets overlooked, even though successful projects are a result of a successful blend of labour, materials and equipment management. When materials are tracked efficiently project time can be optimized, costs can be saved and quality can be maximized.

Efficient materials management remains a challenge in capital and investment construction projects, primarily because each project is treated as an individual endeavor requiring a customized plan. Furthermore, differences in geographical locations and technological requirements create unique and complex challenges across projects

=== Types of construction projects and how this effects materials management ===
Typically, the more technically challenging a project is, the more difficult materials management becomes; however, the need for transparent materials tracking is highlighted in these types of projects.

Residential construction projects: residential projects can be homes or apartment buildings, that are intended for living. Managing material flows in these projects is usually easier, because typically engineering and construction teams as well as budgets are smaller, in comparison to projects listed later in this article. Also, technical specifications for residential projects do not vary as much as, for example, in heavy-industry construction projects.

Commercial construction projects: these types of projects include retail stores, restaurants and hotels. The complexity of the project and the needs for thorough material tracking will typically depend on the size of the project.

Specialized industrial construction projects: these projects are large-scale and technically complex. Examples of these types of projects include nuclear power plants, chemical processing plants, steel mills, pulp mills and oil refineries. The materials procured for these projects require specific engineering knowledge (i.e. piping, valves, motors, industrial tanks, fans, boilers, control valves etc.). The importance of material tracking in these types of projects is extremely high, because the project network is large, materials are procured from all over the world and the construction sites are typically in remote locations with poor infrastructure.

Industrial construction projects: examples of industrial construction projects include warehouses and manufacturing facilities. These types of projects tend to be slightly more complex than residential or commercial construction projects and they require more technical knowledge. This increases the need for efficient materials management.

=== Materials management in capital-heavy construction projects ===
Materials management is the process of planning and controlling material flows. It includes planning and procuring materials, supplier evaluation and selection, purchasing, expenditure, shipping, receipt processes for materials (including quality control), warehousing and inventory, and materials distribution. After the construction project finishes, maintenance of materials can also be looked as a part of materials management.

Material management processes and functions in large-scale capital projects encompass multiple organizations and integrated processes. Capital project supply networks typically include project owners, main contractors, EPC/M contractors, material suppliers, logistics partners and project site contractors.

=== Digital tools for materials management in construction ===
Digital tools are used for materials management in capital projects. Materials requirement planning systems and procurement systems are used in the industry. Procurement cost reduction through bid comparison bids is part of project cost management. Computer-based systems are used during the purchasing process to compare equipment specifications, supplier selection, delivery time guarantees, shipping fees and other procurements-related factors on a single platform.

Material deliveries from the supplier to the construction site can be tracked using various tools. For example, project freight forwards will typically have precise information on containers and deliveries sent to the construction site, but typically their systems lack insight into the specific materials and components within those deliveries. Details on packing lists will be attached to the packages in the delivery and they will typically be sent to the purchaser via email. Other ways of tracking deliveries include RFID-tagging packages or components. The downfall with this method is that suppliers or purchasers have to invest in RFID-tags. Common materials data-bases for the project network can also be implemented to share data on material deliveries.

Once the materials arrive at the construction site, receipt processes for the goods should be followed. The storage locations should be recorded, so that individual components are easy to locate as construction sites. Inventory of the goods should also be monitored (when goods are taken for assembly). Storing procured materials appropriately is crucial for saving costs. For example, if electronical equipment is procured and delivered to the construction site in one lot to save costs on multiple delivery fees, the electrical equipment that is not needed for assembly immediately has to be stored in water-proof locations. Digital tools can be used to plan for incoming deliveries and how to store them. The need for digital tools is furthermore highlighted, if materials are stored for example in contractor warehouses rather than the construction site. This way all project parties will know, where goods can be located.

== See also ==
- Supply chain management
- Document automation
- Enterprise resource planning (ERP)
- Warehouse management system
- Storage management system
- Automated identification and data capture
- Cash conversion cycle
- Consignment stock
- Cost of goods sold
- Economic order quantity
- Economic lot scheduling problem
- Material requirements planning
- Newsvendor model
- Vendor-managed inventory
- Scan-based trading
- ABC analysis
- SWOT analysis
- Inventory investment
- Inventory management software
- Logistics
- Operations research
- Pinch point (economics)
- Project production management
- Service level
- Spare part
- Stock management
