= Break Time =

Break Time may refer to:

- Break Time (EP), an EP by South Korean band U-KISS
- Break Time (convenience store), a chain of convenience stores in Missouri operated by MFA Oil
- Break Time: The National Pool Tour, 1993 video game
