= Prepaid porn =

Printed card giving access to online pornography

Prepaid porn is a printed card with a scratch off password that gives the user access to online pornography without requiring any personal information. Most manufacturers/sales companies sell the cards to distributors who move the cards to retailers. Each company usually offers its own brand, but some sites offer a personalized/custom branding. Many companies advertise the business aspect of prepaid porn cards online as a money making opportunity.

Prepaid porn distributors can be found worldwide excluding some countries such as China and India. The cards are very popular in countries such as England and Australia.

Consumers can buy these cards in gas stations, adult shops, bars and convenience stores. The cards can either be displayed in point of purchase display or in a magazine cover style display. Distributors can put the cards in stores on a consignment or sell them directly to the retailer. The cost of the cards varies by country and currency.
