= Shelter Insurance =

American mutual insurance company

Coordinates: 38.953669°N 92.366288°W

- Company type: Mutual
- Industry: Insurance; Finance
- Predecessor: MFA Mutual Insurance Company
- Founded: 1946
- Headquarters: Columbia, Missouri, USA
- Area served: Arkansas; Colorado; Iowa; Illinois; Indiana; Kansas; Kentucky; Louisiana; Mississippi; Missouri; Nebraska; Nevada; Ohio; Oklahoma; Tennessee
- Key people: Rockne Corbin, President and CEO
- Products: Auto: Private Passenger Auto; Commercial Auto; Motorcycle; Recreational Vehicle; Property: Homeowners; Mobile Homeowners; Farmowners; Dwelling Fire; Farm Fire; Apartment Owners; Personal Inland Marine; Boatowners; Liability: Personal Umbrella; General Liability; Comprehensive Farm Liability; Business: Business Owners; Commercial Fire; Commercial Inland Marine; Cargo; Life
- Services: Insurance; Finance
- Total assets: ▲US$4,340,202,000 (2014); ▲US$4,066,984,000 (2013); ▲US$3,909,298,000 (2012); ▲US$3,705,787,000 (2011); ▲US$3,638,301,000 (2010); ▲US$3,457,048,000 (2009); ▼US$3,298,968,000 (2008); US$3,326,688,000 (2007)
- Number of employees: ▲3,881 (2014); ▲3,807 (2013); ▲3,752 (2012); ▲3,747 (2011); ▲3,655 (2010); ▲3,583 (2009); ▲3,559 (2008); 3,096 (2007)
- Subsidiaries: Shelter Mutual Insurance Company; Shelter General Insurance Company; Shelter Life Insurance Company; Shelter Reinsurance Company; Haulers Insurance Company, Inc.; Shelter Financial Corporation; ~~Shelter Financial Bank~~; Shelter Financial Services, Inc.; Shelter Benefits Management Inc.; Shelter Enterprises, LLC; Daniel Boone Agency, LLC; AmShield Insurance Company; Say Insurance
- Website: shelterinsurance.com
- Footnotes / references "Shelter Insurance Companies 2014 Annual Report" (PDF). Shelter Insurance Companies.

Shelter Mutual Insurance Company is a mutual insurance company which focuses on auto, property, business, and life Insurance. It operates in fifteen U.S. states and its corporate office is located in Columbia, Missouri.

Shelter was founded in 1946 as the insurance subsidiary of the Missouri Farmers Association, and was called MFA Mutual Insurance Company. In 1981, the name was changed to Shelter Insurance Companies, following MFA's popular slogan: “MFA is your Shield of Shelter.” Since its founding, the company's corporate office has remained in Columbia. The Shelter Insurance Gardens are located adjacent to the corporate office in Columbia.

== Closing of Shelter Financial Bank ==
On September 7, 2012, Shelter announced the nko closure of Shelter Financial Bank. Though profitable, the announcement cited the additional costs associated with the Dodd–Frank Wall Street Reform and Consumer Protection Act as the primary reason for closure.
