= Office of Economics, Environmental Analysis and Administration =

The Office of Economics, Environmental Analysis, and Administration (OEEAA) is a part of the Surface Transportation Board of the United States Department of Transportation, a United States government agency. It does work related to railroads.

The OEEAA is responsible for the economic, cost, financial, engineering, and environmental analyses in cases before the Surface Transportation Board (STB). It also provides the administrative support for the STB, including managing buildings and office space and human relations management, and computer systems support.

The OEEAA has a staff of 55 professionals, including varied vocations such as: economists, accountants, financial analysts, engineers, transportation industry analysts, environmental protection specialists, attorneys, computer programmers, personnel specialists, and a variety of administrative support staff. The primary activities and responsibilities of the OEEAA are identified and briefly discussed below.

== Economic Analysis ==
OEEAA supports the STB's decision making process through economic, cost, financial, and engineering analyses. Typically, the types of cases that they are involved in include: railroad maximum rate proceedings, rail mergers, abandonments, rail line construction, and trackage rights matters. The OEEAA can provide economic and cost information for individual railroads by means of these analyses.

OEEAA also collects and maintains databases, including the rail waybill file as well as annual and quarterly financial and operating data for rail carriers. The OEEAA also maintains the annual Uniform Rail Cost System estimate (URCS), which is the STB's general purpose costing system used for various purposes (such as the development and calculation of branch costs)

== Section of Environmental Analysis ==
The Section of Environmental Analysis (SEA) is the office within the Board responsible for directing the environmental review process It conducts independent analysis of all environmental data and makes environmental recommendations to the Board, as well as giving technical advice.

Under the terms of the National Environmental Policy Act (NEPA), the Board must take into account in its decision making, the impact of its actions upon Earth's environment - including direct, indirect and cumulative effects. The STB must consider these effects before making its final decision in a case. SEA assists the STB in meeting this responsibility.

== Administration ==
The administrative side of OEEAA provides a wide range of support to STB staff including:-

- Facilities management (including stationery and copier services, emergency planning and equipment supply).
- Financial management services (including submission and oversight of the STB's annual budget, spending plans, payroll program, and user fee collection systems).
- Human resources support (including hiring new employees, promotions, retirements, staff training issues, grievances, etc.).
- IT Systems support (including maintenance of computer support system, purchase & maintenance of hardware and software).
- Providing guidance and advice to STB Members and staff on issues regarding ethics and codes of conduct.
