= S v Longdistance (Natal) =

In S v Longdistance (Natal) & Others (1989), an important case in South African criminal procedure, the appellants had been convicted on two counts of contravening the Road Transportation Act in that they had conveyed, in two sets of vehicles, each comprising a mechanical horse and trailer, 2,000 pockets of refined sugar in each set of vehicles to a consignee in the Eastern Transvaal who intended reselling it, such transportation not being covered by the provisions of permits issued to the appellants. They appealed.

The appellants contended that there had been an unlawful duplication of charges in that the sugar conveyed constituted one consignment from Durban to the consignee, but that there were two charges regarding the same act.

The court held that the charges against the appellants were that they undertook road transportation otherwise than in accordance with the provisions of the permits.

Furthermore, the separate goods (albeit of the same kind) were conveyed for separate rewards, in separate vehicles driven by separate drivers, and purportedly under separate permits.

Therefore, there could be no doubt that two separate offenses, and not a single offense, had been committed and accordingly there was no improper duplication of charges.
