= Consignment agreement =

Agreement

A consignment agreement is an agreement between a consignee and consignor for the storage, transfer, sale or resale and use of the commodity. The consignee may take goods from the consignment stock for use or resale subject to payment to the consignor agreeably to the terms bargained in the consignment agreement. The unsold goods will normally be returned by the consignee to the consignor.

== Consignment and distribution agreements ==
It may be accompanied by a consignment agreement (Franchising, distributorship or OEM). Goods are stored at the premises of the distributor, or premises of a third party, at distributor's disposal, but remain the property of the exporter.

This agreement decreases the exporter's risk because he remains the owner of the commodities in storage. The distributor does not need to pay until he has sold the commodities, so he improves his cash flow. Both parties must ensure that the consignment agreement is formulated very carefully, so no room for doubt remains with regard to third parties, specifically the distributor's creditors in case of his bankruptcy. The distributor and the exporter have incompatible interests. The distributor's interest will be to increase the amount of the stock in consignment because this has no effect on his cash situation. Therefore the parties should agree on reasonable stock rolling adapted to the market demand, and consider how quickly the exporter may produce and deliver additional goods in order to avoid stock disruption.

Fulfillment of certain conditions is requested by the customs and VAT authorities. Due to the European VAT rules, it is easier to have a consignment stock between EU countries. The distributor is required to keep accurate accounts, but dispensable to have a bonded warehouse.

== See also ==
- Consignment stock
