= CEFOR =

The Central Union of Marine Underwriters (CEFOR) was founded August 15, 1911 by Norwegian and foreign insurance companies and is the marine insurance market organization of Norway.

The members of CEFOR engage in hull and machinery insurance (blue water and coastal), protection and indemnity insurance, cargo insurance, legal defense, and war risks.
