= Inland marine insurance =

Type of insurance in the United States

Inland marine insurance is an insurance category in the United States that indemnifies loss to movable or specialized types of property, historically developing as an outgrowth of ocean marine insurance. The term marine is of historical origin and the insurance definition has evolved to include a wide range of property and materials that are not marine related but may be in transit or deemed mobile including: property in transit, property in the custody of a bailee, property deemed to be an instrumentality of transportation or communication, such as bridges and radio towers, mobile medical equipment, and contractors equipment.

This category of insurance includes property coverage for construction equipment, medical diagnostic equipment, fine arts, solar panels and wind turbines, cameras and movie equipment, musical instruments, and a wide variety of other types of property.

== History ==
Traditionally, marine insurers such as the underwriters at Lloyd's of London covered cargo in the course of international commercial voyages by sea, providing coverage on an "all risk" basis: physical loss or damage from any cause was covered unless the policy specifically excluded that cause. Subsequently, a marketplace for fire insurance for buildings on land arose, especially after the Great Fire of London in 1666. Fire insurance companies typically provided narrower coverage, where the policies specifically listed the only perils covered, and excluded all losses from any other causes.

In the 19th century, the course of the Industrial Revolution gave rise to new exposures on land, such as telegraphs, railroad equipment, and other types of property with which fire insurance companies were unfamiliar, and inclined to grant coverage only for "enumerated perils". Marine insurers, accustomed to providing "all risk" coverage to cargo in transit, began competing in the insurance marketplace for these types of equipment and other "instrumentalities of communication and transportation". Despite the word marine, most inland marine coverages are for property on land, with property transported by water insured under ocean marine. This led to marine insurers competing in the fire insurance marketplace against fire insurance companies. Ultimately, the National Association of Insurance Commissioners in the United States regulated the situation, adopting a Nationwide Marine Definition in 1933 which laid out what types of property were eligible for "inland marine" insurance coverage.

In the United States, inland marine insurance comprises about 2% of total premiums but account for a higher percent of the profit. Like ocean marine insurance, inland marine insurance has been traditionally less regulated in the United States.

Inland marine policies became known as "floaters" since the property to which coverage was originally extended was essentially "floating." The coverage has grown to include property that just involves an element of transportation.

== Coverage ==
The property that is insured under inland marine coverage is typically one of the following:

- Actually in transit
- Held by a bailee
- At a fixed location that is an instrument of transportation
- A movable type of goods that is often at different locations

The following coverages represent a wide range of the types of coverages typically called "inland marine":

- Accounts Receivable
- Bailee Customer's Goods
- Builders' Risk
- Camera and Photographic Equipment
- Communication Towers and Equipment
- Computer Coverage
- Contractors Equipment
- Commercial Floaters
- Dealers
- Exhibitions
- Fine Arts
- Furriers
- Golf Equipment
- Guns
- Installation
- Jewelers
- Leased Property
- Mobile Medical Equipment
- Motor Truck Cargo
- Museums
- Musical Instruments
- Processing Risks
- Rigger's Liability
- Scheduled Property
- Transportation
- Trip Transit
- Valuable Papers
- Warehouse Legal

== See also ==
- History of insurance
- Property insurance
- Marine insurance
