= MFA Incorporated =

- Type: Agricultural Cooperative
- Industry: Agriculture
- Founded: 1914
- Headquarters: Columbia, Missouri, U.S.
- Key people: Ernie Verslues, President & CEO
- Number of employees: 1,200
- Website: mfa-inc.com

MFA Incorporated is a Midwest-based regional agricultural cooperative serving more than 45,000 farmer/owners in Missouri and adjacent states.

Founded on March 10, 1914, MFA, which once stood for Missouri Farmers Association, traces its beginnings to a one-room schoolhouse near Brunswick, Missouri. At Newcomer School on March 10, 1914, seven farmers met to discuss an article by William A. Hirth, owner of a magazine known as The Missouri Farmer and Breeder. In the magazine, Hirth called for formation of farm clubs. Seven Brunswick-area farmers (Aaron Bachtel, Tom Penick, Will Heisel, George Heisel, Earl Smutz, John Kohl and Will Armstrong) met to discuss Hirth's article and soon placed the first cooperative order for 1,150 pounds of baler twine.

By banding together for economic strength, members of the Newcomers Schoolhouse Farm Club saved $400 in several group transactions. Hirth handled the orders free of charge.

From that meeting emerged a cooperative that grew to become the largest business enterprise in the state. By the 1920s, MFA represented 400 local cooperatives. William Hirth was MFA's first president, serving until his death in 1940. Hirth was a critic of the agricultural policies of Calvin Coolidge and Herbert Hoover, and advocated for Franklin D. Roosevelt in the 1932 election. Fred V. Heinkel served as president from 1940 through 1979 and oversaw a period of tremendous growth in MFA memberships, income, and associated businesses. Heinkel was succeeded by Eric Thompson.

Today, it is based in Columbia, Missouri. The cooperative created independent companies to serve its members: MFA Oil in 1929 and Shelter Insurance in 1946.
