= Vendor-managed inventory =

Inventory management method

Vendor-managed inventory (VMI) is an inventory management practice in which a supplier of goods, usually the manufacturer, is responsible for optimizing the inventory held by a distributor.

Under VMI, the retailer shares their inventory data with a vendor (sometimes called supplier) such that the vendor is the decision-maker who determines the order size, whereas in traditional inventory management, the retailer (sometimes called distributor or buyer) makes his or her own decisions regarding the order size. Thus, the vendor is responsible for the retailer's ordering cost, while the retailer usually acquires ownership of the stock and has to pay for their own holding cost. One supply chain management glossary identifies VMI as

The practice of retailers making suppliers responsible for determining order size and timing, usually based on receipt of retail POS and inventory data.

although a 2008 article notes that there is no standard definition of VMI and the term's usage varies "significantly" among companies supporting VMI processes.

A third-party logistics provider may also be involved to help ensure that the buyer has the required level of inventory by adjusting the demand and supply gaps.

== Overview ==
One of the keys to making VMI work is shared risk. In some cases, if the inventory does not sell, the vendor (supplier) will repurchase the product from the buyer (retailer). In other cases, the product may be in the possession of the retailer but is not owned by the retailer until the sale takes place, meaning that the retailer simply houses (and assists with the sale of) the product in exchange for a predetermined commission or profit (sometimes referred to as consignment stock). A special form of this commission business is scan-based trading, where VMI is usually applied but its use is not mandatory.

This is one of the successful business models used by Walmart, Procter & Gamble and many other big box retailers. Oil companies often use technology to manage the gasoline inventories at the service stations that they supply (see Petrolsoft Corporation). Home Depot uses the technique with larger suppliers of manufactured goods. VMI helps foster a closer understanding between the supplier and manufacturer by using electronic data interchange formats, EDI software and statistical methodologies to forecast and maintain correct inventory in the supply chain.

Vendors benefit from more control of displays and more customer contact for their employees; retailers benefit from reduced risk, better store staff knowledge (which builds brand loyalty for both the vendor and the retailer), and reduced display maintenance outlays.

Usage of VMI can prevent stocking undesired inventories and hence can lead to an overall cost reduction. Moreover, the magnitude of the bullwhip effect is also reduced by employing the VMI approach in a buyer-supplier cooperation.

At the goods manufacturing level, VMI helps prevent overflowing warehouses or shortages, as well as costly labor, purchasing and accounting. With VMI, businesses maintain a proper inventory, and optimized inventory leads to easy access and fast processing with reduced labor costs.

Variant models include "consigned VMI", where the supplier or manufacturer retains ownership, and "dynamic VMI", where the buffer inventory remains located with the supplier, which can be beneficial if the supplier and retailer are located close enough together, and allows for buffer stock to be shared among distributors.

As a symbiotic business relationship, VMI makes it less likely that a business will unintentionally run out of stock of a good and reduces inventory in the supply chain. Furthermore, vendor (supplier) representatives in a store benefit the vendor by ensuring the product is properly displayed and store staff are familiar with the features of the product line, all these while helping to clean and organize their product lines for the store. However, high-tech sector research undertaken in 2003 concluded that under VMI, "sizeable inventory burdens [are transferred] from the customer to the supplier" and that "significant additional operating expenses for the supplier" therefore arise.

== Components ==
1. Inventory location

In VMI practice, inventory location depends on the arrangement between the vendor and the customer. The first option is for the inventory to be located both at the customer's and the supplier's premises. For the supplier, this serves as a safeguard against short delivery cycles or unsynchronized production cycles. On the other hand, this arrangement can also lead to higher inventory holding costs because of the need for storage of the material, its tracking and handling, and the threat of inventory obsolescence.

Another option can be for the vendor to deliver to the customer's central warehouse or alternatively, to a third party's warehouse. The latter can be a solution for buyers that have outsourced part or all of their logistics operations. Managing the inventory at the central warehouse enables better optimization of deliveries, lower costs and ultimately enables the buyer to maximize economies of scale. However, it is not always an option, so third-party warehouses are often the solution to many different problems such as the supplier's warehouse being too far away from the buyer's or the buyer's inexperience in storing particular types of goods that are harder to store.

The inventory can also be located directly at the buyer's premises such as the buyer's on-site warehouse, production line or the shop floor itself. However, replenishing inventory levels at these specific locations can be more costly, less organized and overall more difficult to manage for the supplier.

2. Inventory Ownership

Inventory ownership refers to the ownership of the inventory and when the invoice is being issued to the retailer. In vendor managed inventory, there is a number of solutions in terms of payment and transfer of ownership.

In the first alternative, the vendor is the owner of inventory at the premises of the customer. Invoice is issued when the items are issued from the stock. In the second alternative, the retailer assumes ownership of the inventory, but receives an invoice upon delivery. However, the vendor is not paid until the customer issues the items from stock and within a delay according to agreed terms of payment. This enables risk-sharing between both parties, as the retailer carries risk of obsolescence while the vendor would have been accountable for capital costs and fluctuation in prices of the inventory.

In the third alternative, also referred to as a standard process in traditional order delivery, the retailer owns the inventory upon delivery, while the vendor invoices the retailer once the shipment has been made. In this setting, retailer is responsible for inventory investment and holding costs, but has an option of protecting themselves against price fluctuations.

3. Level of Demand Visibility

These elements refer to the type of demand information shared by customers to assist the suppliers in controlling their inventory. Many types of demand information are shared in the VMI Program. The demand information that are visible to the supplier are: sales data, stock withdrawal, production schedule, inventory level, goods in transit, back order, incoming order and return. It is argued that sharing data and inventory can improve the supplier’s production planning, make it more stable and increase its visibility. It also provides a better understanding of the seasonal changes, and helps to figure out critical times. The supplier can therefore take advantage of this information and adapt its production to the customers’ requests, and respond faster. With the increasing visibility of information, the supplier has a longer timeframe for replenishment arrangement. The supplier also gets real time visibility, which allows him to have a hand on the inventory for the buyer demand forecast, which allows for projecting inventory based on future demand to target his inventory (minimize or maximize it). This stability and coordination allows to reduce the bullwhip effect, as the manufacturer has a clearer visibility on the supply chain and an overview of the incoming demand. On the retailer’s side, all the costs associated with inventory management, (holding costs, shortage costs, spoilage costs, etc.) are greatly reduced. E.g., the retailer will rarely face stock shortage and holding costs are kept at a minimum since just enough inventory is held.

Data is usually updated every week and is transmitted through an EDI, which allows forecasting actual market trends. The data is based on real quantities of produced and sold items. This agreement to share information is aimed at maintaining a steady flow of necessary goods.

== Classes of mathematical model ==
1. Bi-Level VMI Mathematical Models

The first class of VMI, bi-level VMI mathematical model, includes two levels (or echelons) in a supply chain: vendor and retailer. There are three types of VMI mathematical models developed from this class, which are single-vendor single-retailer VMI model, single-vendor multi-retailer VMI model, and multi-vendor multi-retailer VMI model. This class has been significantly developing. For example, single-vendor single-retailer VMI model was extended for multi-product case, the consignment stock (CS), and discount.

2. Multi-Level VMI Mathematical Models

The second class is a multi-level VMI mathematical model such as a single manufacturer-single vendor multi-retailer (SM-SV-MR) VMI model. Those studies [which] fail to model replenishment frequencies cannot be classified here.

Replenishment frequencies play an important role in integrated inventory models to reduce the total supply chain cost, but it has been noted that many studies fail to model it in mathematical problems.

== See also ==
- Consignment stock
- Electronic data interchange
- Scan-based trading
