= Break Time: The National Pool Tour =

1993 video game

- Cover art
- Publisher: Fujisankei
- Platform: Nintendo Entertainment System
- Release: NA: January 1993
- Genre: Sports
- Mode: Multiplayer

Break Time: The National Pool Tour is a pocket billiards (pool) video game released for the Nintendo Entertainment System in 1993 exclusively for a North American audience.

== Features ==
There are four unique challenges in the game: eight-ball, nine-ball, rotation, and straight pool. All four are allegedly played according to the professional (i.e. world standardized) rules. Other features include:

- Four games
- Two-player support
- Practice mode
- Password save feature
- Trick shots
- Beat five pros in five cities

== Reception ==
Electronic Games gave the game 71%. GamePro gave the game 4/5 for graphics, 3/5 for sound, 4/5 for control, 4.5/5 for Fun factor.
