= Amicable Society for a Perpetual Assurance Office =

Coordinates: 51.514080°N 0.108684°W

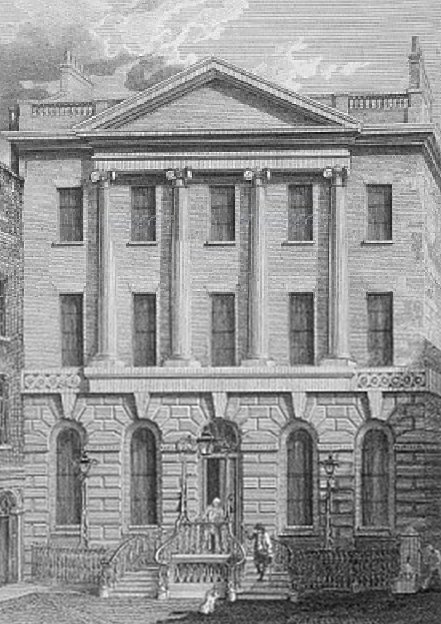
Amicable Society for a Perpetual Assurance Office, Serjeants' Inn, Fleet Street, London, 1801

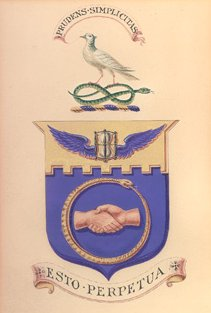
Amicable Society coat of arms

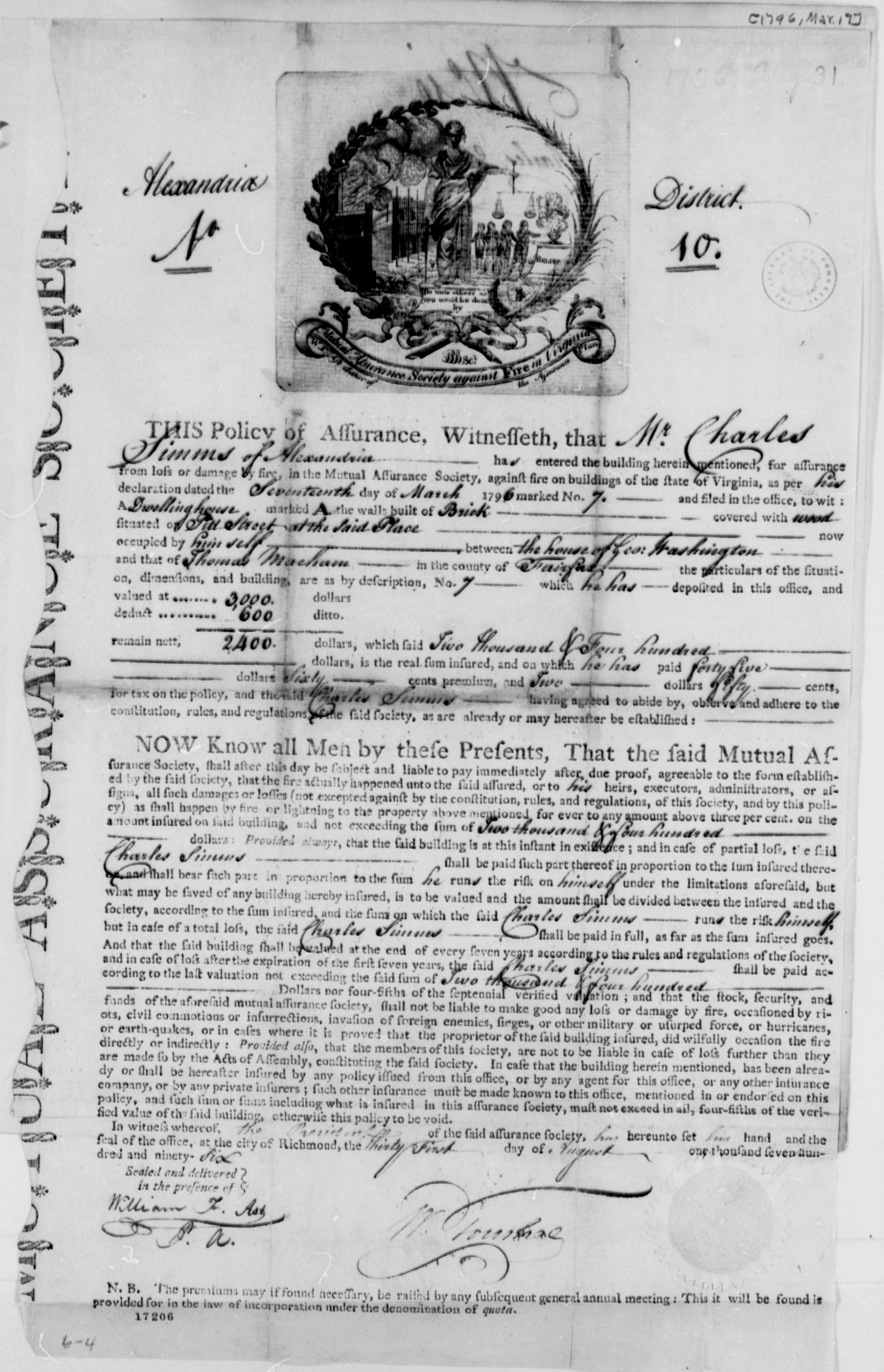
Fire insurance contract of 1796

Amicable Society for a Perpetual Assurance Office (a.k.a. Amicable Society) is considered the first life insurance company in the world. It was acquired by Norwich Union Life Insurance Society in 1866, this required an act of Parliament.

== Sources ==
- Amicable Society, The charters, acts of Parliament, and by-laws of the corporation of the Amicable Society for a perpetual assurance office, Gilbert and Rivington, 1854
- Anzovin, Steven, Famous First Facts 2000, item # 2422, H. W. Wilson Company, ISBN 0-8242-0958-3
- Baynes, Thomas Spencer, The Encyclopædia Britannica: a dictionary of arts, sciences, and general literature, Volume 13, H.G. Allen, 1888
- Price, Richard, Observations on reversionary payments: on schemes for providing annuities for widows, and for persons in old age; on the method of calculating the values of assurances on lives; and on the national debt, T. Cadell & W. Davies, 1812
