= Scan-based trading =

Scan-based trading (SBT) is the process by which suppliers maintain ownership of inventory within retailers' warehouses or stores until items are scanned at the point of sale. Suppliers, such as manufacturers or farmers, own the product until it is purchased by the customer, with the store or venue then buying the product from the supplier and reselling it to the customer. Analysts in the grocery sector estimate scan-based trading accounted for $21 billion in consumer goods purchased in the grocery industry alone in 2020, or nearly 3% of overall sales.

== History ==
Traditionally scan-based trading programs use electronic data interchange solutions as the key component to synchronize information on store locations (Organizational Structure 816), items (Price/Sales Catalog 832), daily sales (Product Activity Data 852), receivings (Receiving Advice 861), billings (Invoice 810) and payments (Remittance Advice 820) between a retailer and its Scan-Based Trading suppliers.

== Pros and cons ==
In the magazine industry, the full implementation of SBT has been estimated to provide operational savings to the retailers and suppliers of $220 million per year. SBT can lead to improved retailer relationships. The greatest competitive advantage for a supplier is increased collaboration and visibility in its retail-trading partner's organization, including reduced cost for sales staff to service retailers. By using the coordinated “bi-directional item information synchronization approach" inherent in SBT, suppliers have reported a 7% to 13% reduction in sales force time spent communicating basic item information to customers, following up, and resolving queries. With partners agreeing on details like item, price, promotion and shrink at the onset of an SBT relationship, suppliers are able to better service accounts and reduce billing and invoice issues. The improved relationships also allow suppliers to use SBT as a competitive weapon to gain exclusivity at retailers. SBT suppliers are becoming increasingly aggressive in approaching retailers and offering to use SBT on all of their products in exchange for exclusivity in the retailer's stores.

Another benefit can be increased sales. SBT suppliers have estimated that their increase in sales by switching to a scan-based trading model is from 1% to 5%. Despite what this industry- paid for study shows, sales are not increased by SBT. As long as sufficient product is in the store prior sales remain the same in newspapers. Actually given theft of the product due to non scanning sales will decrease when inventory is adjusted to reflect real sales, not just used product.

SBT may also cause improved visibility of product sales. As a part of SBT programs, suppliers receive sales by item by store by date. This information provides the supplier with an up-to-date view on the sales of product which is useful in sales forecasting and inventory management.

There is also a reduced cost of inventory. In the supply chain for supplier-merchandized product, retailers will experience a reduction in cost of inventory. With SBT, product deliveries are based on store inventory of individual items. There is a large reduction in product held in the supply chain (typically by suppliers agents/merchandisers/jobbers). It generally causes a reduction in non-sellable product: Suppliers use SBT to lower the costs associated with non-sellable products (i.e., discontinued, damaged, or out-of-code products that retailers return). SBT provides greater visibility into scan-sales data, allowing suppliers to better understand the demand chain so that they can anticipate and reduce obsolescence and improve overall profitability.

Another thing it may do is reduced time to market. SBT allows suppliers to put new products into retail outlets at no risk to the retailer, since the supplier continues to own the inventory until it is scanned at the point of sale. This allows the supplier to determine new item performance and adjust selection before wide-scale rollout. The result is increased selection of timely products which results in a better shopping experience for the consumer and increased sales for both the retailer and supplier because the "expert" on product, the supplier, who is in charge of inventory selection. On average, the time to roll out new CPG product is four weeks. Introducing new product with the “advanced” item synchronization business processes and the elimination of the item approval process inherent in scan-based trading reduces the time by at least one half.

One disadvantage is the initial technological cost. There may be some other disadvantages to scan- based trading, such as increased inventory shrinkage. Also, employees have been known to take, steal consignor items for their own use, give them away, or even charge and keep; doing so can be thought to hurt their employer vendor's bottom line less than stealing vendor owned product. In addition, management could sell without scanning thereby realizing the revenue but with no cost therefore the entire sale goes directly to profit on the bottom line, but doing so is Embezzlement and can result in serious legal action and broken vendor relationships which dwarf the petty increase in revenue at the time of theft.

For retailers, the implementation of SBT has been seen as a goal as it saves money and improves customer satisfaction. There are some benefits for retailers switching to SBT:

There may be increased sales, typically driven by the supplier having more time in the store to merchandise its product, fill holes, and maintain plan-o-gram integrity. In addition, several retailers mentioned suppliers were able to make an additional stop at each store during the week to merchandise products and prevent out-of-stocks. Salmon and Associates reported that "a grocery retailer's sales increased in every product category it tested... Sales increases ranged from 1% to 5%, based on product category". Schnuck Markets reported a 4% increase in sales for its SBT pilot.

SBT can result in reduced invoice/order processing costs. Retailers have reported that the cost to process SBT suppliers is much less than "normal" suppliers as items, price, promotions, and allowance disputes are greatly reduced by pre-set agreements and the use of EDI to synchronize item information between suppliers and retailers. Schnuck Markets reported a nearly 70% reduction in invoice deductions with time spent resolving item and price discrepancies cut in half.

There is a lowered cost of inventory; As SBT changes inventory ownership to the supplier, the retailer experiences a reduction in retailer-owned inventory.

Financial metrics may be improved too- once inventory levels were reduced, all financial metrics that incorporate inventory levels (such as working capital required, return on assets (RONA), and quick ratios) showed improvement: working capital can be reduced as much as 15%, RONA increased as much 4%, and the quick ratio increased as much as 7%.

There can also be reduced stock outages. SBT forces the supplier to manage and merchandize its products to ensure that the right product is on the shelf at the right time or the supplier will see a loss of revenue. This provides a powerful incentive to reduce stock outages. As an example, during its SBT pilot, Rite-Aid realized a 32% decrease in out-of-stocks.

== Early history ==
In 1998, regional magazine and newspaper distributor Current News became one of the earliest distributors of magazines to offer scan-based trading to retailers. The Grocery Manufacturers Association (GMA) ran a test of the concept in 2000 with Schnuck Markets in St. Louis, Missouri, and Andronico's Market of Berkeley, California and a dozen suppliers. Sales went up 3% to 4% for the retailers and between 2.5% and 5.2% for suppliers. Mispricing of stock items were decreased by 70%.

== Application to direct-store-delivered items ==
Scan-based trading is primarily applicable to products distributed through direct store delivery, commonly referred to as DSD. The most common application of scan-based trading to DSD products involves garden seeds, DVDs/Blu-ray Discs, newspapers and magazines. Nearly all newspapers and magazines are distributed to retailers by the DSD method of distribution. According to an analysis by one vendor, "most major retailers in the U.S. – including CVS, Safeway, Kroger Ahold’s divisions, A&P and its subsidiaries, Hess, Barnes & Noble and Rite Aid – conduct their newspaper business using the SBT model." According to Poff "Most [retailers] rely on a third-party partner to provide oversight.

== See also ==
- Consignment
- Vendor-managed inventory
