= Legitimacy (criminal law) =

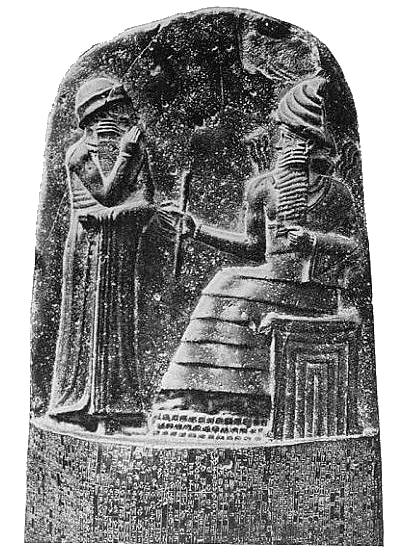
Shamash (seated), depicted as handing symbols of authority to Hammurabi (relief on the upper part of the stele of Hammurabi's code of laws).

In law, "legitimacy" is distinguished from "legality" (see also color of law). An action can be legal but not legitimate or vice versa it can be legitimate but not legal.

Thomas Hilbink suggests that the power to compel obedience to the law, is derived from the power to sway public opinion, to the belief that the law and its agents are legitimate and deserving of this obedience.

Where as Tyler says, 'Legitimacy is ...a psychological property of an authority, institution, or social arrangement, that leads those connected to it to believe that it is appropriate, proper, and just' (Tyler, 2006b: 375). Thus viewed, the legal legitimacy is the belief that the law and agents of the law are rightful holders of authority; that they have the right to dictate appropriate behaviour and are entitled to be obeyed; and that laws should be obeyed, simply because, that is the right thing to do (Tyler, 2006a; Tyler, 2006b; cf. Easton, 1965).

== Development of legal legitimacy ==
Peter Kropotkin suggested that acceptance of the rule of law developed in response to the rampant abuse of authority by the nobility; post advent of the middle class after the French Revolution, strict adherence to the law was conceived as the ultimate equalizer within society. “Whatever this law might be,” Kropotkin writes, “it promised to affect lord and peasant alike; it proclaimed the equality of rich and poor before the judge”.

To establish that a government action can be legal whilst not being legitimate; e.g., the Gulf of Tonkin Resolution, which allowed the United States to wage war against Vietnam without a formal declaration of war. It is also possible for a government action to be legitimate without being legal; e.g., a pre-emptive war, a military junta. An example of such matters arises when legitimate institutions clash in a constitutional crisis.

Legitimacy is the right to rule and the recognition by the ruled of that right (Sternberger, 1968; Beetham, 1991; Coicaud, 2002; Tyler, 2006a; Bottoms and Tankebe, in press). Social institutions need legitimacy if they are to develop, operate, and reproduce themselves effectively (Easton, 1965). This is as true for the police as it is for other institutions of government. But peculiar to the police function is the state-sponsored use of violence and force, the resolution of conflict, and the enforcement of legally-prescribed conduct and rule-following (Banton, 1964; Bittner, 1970; Reiner, 2010). Police legitimacy and public consent are necessary conditions of the justifiable use of state power: those who are subject to policing must see the police as right and proper (Tyler, 2006b, 2011a; Schulolfer et al., in press).

By linking legitimacy to public compliance, Tyler's work generates a psychology of authorization and consent. The legitimacy of the police and the law leads to a respect for legal guidelines for action that dictates appropriate and personally binding behaviour. These guidelines may not be perfectly aligned with everyone's moral system. We do not always agree with the moral force of each and every law. But legitimacy involves the public recognition that the social order needs a system of laws that generate compliance and respect above and beyond individual preferences (or disagreements) with specific laws. When people believe it is morally just to obey the law, so long as they know that a particular act is illegal, then the immorality of illegal behaviour becomes a given. A different sort of morality ‘kicks in.’ Naturally, there are other reasons why individuals do (or do not) comply with the law (Bottoms, 2001).

== Limitations ==
According to Lawrence Solum, since legitimacy has different shades of meaning, it is very easy to make claims about legitimacy that are ambiguous or theoretically unsound so one needs to be extra care full before deploying the idea of legitimacy. These multiple meanings are linked to distinct approaches to conceptualization and measurement, with scholars variably treating legitimacy as a property of an object, a perception of observers, or a characteristic of certain social environments.

== Legitimacy and legal socialisation ==
Compliance may be related in large part to habitual or routinized behaviours and orientations. If one complies with the law because such compliance is ‘ingrained in everyday life’ (Robinson and McNeill, 2008: 436), it is unlikely that one will perceive breaking the law as an option when confronted with a situation which, objectively at least, offers such an opportunity. Equally, there will be those who are deterred by the presence of formal or informal mechanisms of social control. Genetic and psychological factors may be an influence; community context and effects might also be important; all these and other notions have been brought to bear on attempts to explain why people commit crime.

== See also ==
- Acceptance
- Legitimacy (political)
- Legal anthropology
- Narrative
- Rational-legal authority
