= MFA Oil =

Missouri based energy cooperative

MFA Oil Company

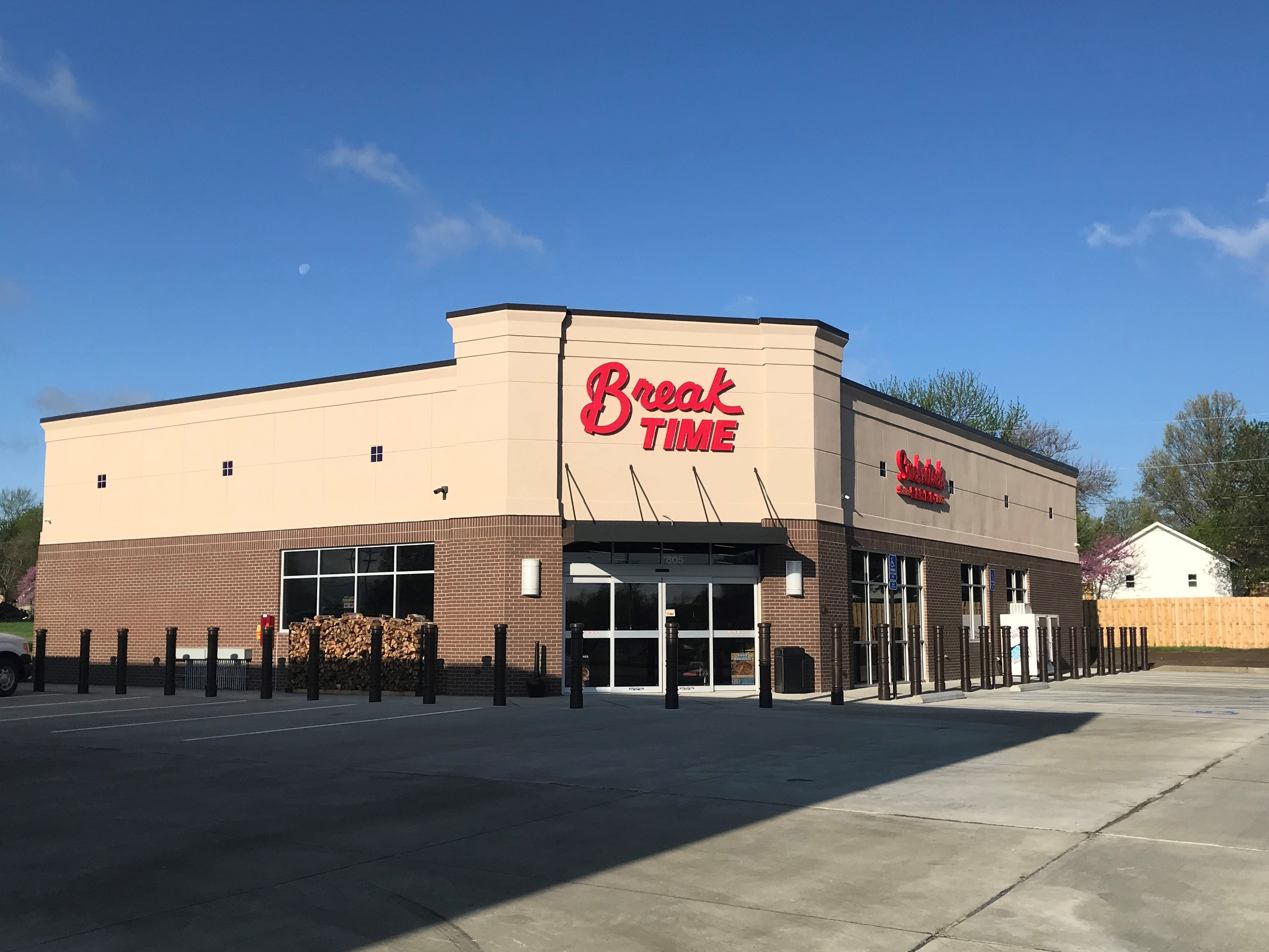
- A Break Time store located in Macon, Missouri
- Company type: Agricultural supply cooperative
- Industry: Oil, energy
- Founded: 1929; 97 years ago
- Founder: Missouri Farmers Association
- Headquarters: Columbia, Missouri, United States
- Area served: United States
- Products: fuel and lubrication products, petroleum and propane
- Number of employees: 1,600+
- Subsidiaries: Break Time
- Website: www.mfaoil.com

MFA Oil Company is an energy cooperative that is headquartered in Columbia, Missouri.

== History ==
MFA Oil was started in 1929 by the Missouri Farmers Association based in Columbia. Its first subsidiary Break Time store opened in 1985.

== Operations ==
MFA Oil employs over 1,600 people. It produces fuel and lubrication products, and manages bulk petroleum and propane plants in the central US. Additionally, the company operates a chain of gas stations and more than 70 Break Time retail convenience stores in Missouri and Arkansas.

=== Break Time subsidiary ===

Break Time is a chain of convenience stores and gas stations owned and operated by MFA Oil. It is also headquartered in Columbia; and operates 74 stores across the state. All Break Time locations sell MFA Oil gasoline and BOSS diesel fuel. Nearly half a dozen Break Time locations have a car wash. The convenience store offers a variety of food and drink options, including their proprietary Dashboard Diner sandwiches, Smokestack Bar.B.Q., Krispy Krunchy Chicken, Hunt Brothers Pizza, and homemade breakfast sandwiches. The locations have beer caves as well as coffee and cappuccino options.

Since 2017, Break Time customers have had the opportunity to earn fuel discounts, free drinks, 'Break Time Bucks,' and more rewards through their store visits and MyTime Rewards use. In 2019, MyTime Rewards earned two industry awards for marketing innovation and program design.

=== Franchise holder ===
MFA Oil owns Big O Tires franchise stores in Missouri, Arkansas and Kansas. The company is one of the area's largest distributors of E85 and E10 corn-based ethanol fuels.
