= Consignee =

Party who receives the good in a contract of carriage

A consignee is a person or entity to which goods are consigned. In a contract of carriage, the consignee is the entity who is financially responsible (the buyer) for the receipt of a shipment.

If a sender dispatches an item to a receiver via a delivery service, the sender is the consignor, the recipient is the consignee, and the deliverer is the carrier.

== A brief statement of law ==
This is a difficult area of law, in that it regulates the mass transportation industry, which cannot always guarantee arrival on time or that goods will not be damaged in the course of transit. Two other problems are that unpaid consignors or freight carriers may wish to hold goods until payment is made, and that fraudulent individuals may seek to take delivery in place of the legitimate consignees. The key to resolving such disputes lies in the documentation. The standard form of contract is a bill of lading which, in international shipping law, is simply a contract for the carriage of goods entered into between the shipper and the carrier that is not a charter party. It is always a term of that contract that the carrier must deliver the goods to a specific receiver.

=== Documentation and legal requirements for delivery ===
Straight bills of lading by land or sea, or air waybill are not documents of title to the goods that they represent. They do no more than require delivery of the goods to the named consignee and (subject to the shipper's ability to redirect the goods) to no other. This differs from "order" or "bearer" bills of lading, which are possessory title documents and negotiable, i.e. they can be endorsed and so transfer the right to take delivery to the last endorsee. This aspect of shipping law is regulated by the Hague Rules, and the laws of individual countries, e.g. the UK Carriage of Goods by Sea Act 1992 and the U.S. Pomerene Act 1916. There is some international dispute as to whether the consignee on a straight bill must produce the bill in order to take delivery. The U.S. position is that the person taking delivery must prove his or her identity but, as in Hong Kong, there is no need to present the bill itself. In the UK there are conflicting obiter dicta in The Rafaela S [2003] 2 Lloyd's Rep. 113 and The Happy Ranger [2002] 2 AER (Comm) 23, so the matter must remain unclear even though there are serious problems, for example, arising from the everyday occurrence of cargo being discharged against letters of indemnity when original bills of lading are not yet available to be presented at the discharge port.

=== Consignee rights ===
The rights of the consignee under an air waybill are regulated by the Warsaw Convention for the Unification of Certain Rules for International Carriage by Air, 1929 and the Montreal Convention for the Unification of Certain Rules for International Carriage by Air 1999 and the relevant state laws (which may be one law chosen as the proper law by the parties, or any combination of laws representing the seller, buyer, consignor, and carrier.) This is very important as per export documents.

The receiver can be different than that of the consignee.
