= Consignor =

Party who sends a good in a contract of carriage

The consignor is the party to a contract that dispatches goods to another party on consignment. In a contract of carriage, is the party sending a shipment to be delivered whether by land, sea or air. Some carriers, such as national postal entities, use the term "sender" or "shipper" but in the event of a legal dispute the proper and technical term "consignor" will generally be used.
