= Contract of carriage =

Contract between carriers of goods/passengers and the sender/receiver or passenger

A contract of carriage is a contract between a carrier of cargo or passengers and the consignor, consignee or passenger. Contracts of carriage define the rights, duties and liabilities of parties to the contract, addressing topics such as acts of God and including clauses such as force majeure (removing liability for extraordinary occurrences beyond control of the parties). Among common carriers, the terms and conditions of the contract may be printed on the reverse of a ticket or carriage document.

For cargo shipments, notification of a shipment’s arrival is usually sent to the "notify party", whose address appears on the shipping document. This party is usually either the buyer or the importer.

== Carriage by sea ==
The 1950 legal case of Heskell v. Continental Express ([1950] 1 All E.R. 1033) provides a description of [the process of carriage, including the roles of forwarding agents and loading brokers in this process.

== Rail travel ==
Cross-border European railway tickets are covered by the CIV conditions of sale.

== Air travel ==
In July 2010, it became widely public that Southwest Airlines had classified mechanical difficulties as an act of God in their contract of carriage, expanding the definition formerly shared with Delta, American, Continental and United. This was later clarified by the airline as mechanical difficulties beyond the airline's control, as for instance the failure of the air traffic control system, or fuel delivery systems operated by airports.

=== Involuntary denied boarding ===
Airlines may sell more tickets for a flight than the number of seats that are actually available. This overselling can result in too many passengers turning up for a flight. When this happens, the airline first asks for volunteers to give up their seat in return for compensation. However, if there are not enough volunteers, the airline itself designates which passengers will have to give up their seats. This process is called involuntary denied boarding or (less formally) bumping.

The proportion of passengers who are involuntarily denied boarding is around 1 in 10,000, and has been falling for the 25 years between 1990 and 2015.

According to aviation analyst Henry Harteveldt, the airlines' contracts of carriage favour the company, not the passenger. Involuntary denial of boarding is not uncommon, but removal after boarding because the seat is needed by others is "exceedingly rare". Nonetheless, an airline has a right to do so based on the contract, in his view. "Remember, it is their aircraft and their seat — you're just renting it to get from point A to point B", Harteveldt told Business Insider in 2017.
