= Consignment =

Selling of one's personal property through a third-party vendor

Consignment is a process whereby a person gives permission to another party to take care of their property while retaining full ownership of the property until the item is sold to the final buyer. It is generally done during auctions, shipping, goods transfer, or putting something up for sale in a consignment store. The owner of the goods pays the third party a portion of the sales price for facilitating the sale. Consignors maintain the rights to their property until the item is sold or abandoned. Many consignment shops and online consignment platforms have a set time limit (usually 60–90 days) at which an item's availability for sale expires.

Consignment stock is stock legally owned by one party but held by another, meaning that the risk and rewards regarding it remain with the first party while the second party is responsible for distribution or retail operations.

The verb consign means "to send", and therefore the noun consignment means "sending goods to another person". In the case of retail consignment or sales consignment (often just referred to as a "consignment"), goods are sent to an agent for the purpose of sale. Legal ownership of these goods remains with the sender. The agent sells the goods on behalf of the sender according to instructions. The sender of goods is known as the consignor, and the agent entrusted with the custody and care of the goods is known as the consignee.

== Concept ==
Consignment (Latin: consignatio, meaning "securitization" or "document") is a traditional legal and accounting technical term for logistics and business management and describes a special form of delivery of goods.

Generally, three conditions must be met for a good to be considered part of a consignment trade:

1. The owner or supplier must make the good(s) physically available to the sales agent in contracted quantities for trade or consumption. Risk remains solely with the supplier, allowing the agent to concentrate on sales; the agent does not need capital to cover the goods. Such arrangements are typically used by suppliers who lack the time or resources necessary to effect the sale of the good(s). By providing the customer with a stock, the supplier encourages consumption and sales.
2. The sales agent must receive some form of payment or compensation from the supplier for facilitating the sale. The supplier is usually paid by the sales agent only after the good is sold and has been paid for by the buyer. The agreement typically, though not necessarily, includes a continuous replenishment of supplies for the sales inventories.
3. Until the good is purchased by the buyer, ownership of the good legally remains with the supplier, despite the sales agent having physical custody of the good. This means that the stock represents a form of credit from the supplier and a debt for the sales agent. The sales agent is contractually obligated to repay the value of this debt, minus the fee for facilitating the sale, to the supplier when the stock is finally sold. In legal disputes or bankruptcies, the good is the supplier's and not the sales agent's property.

=== Examples ===
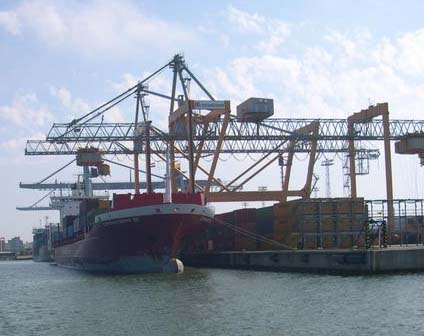
A container ship at the Port of Helsinki in Finland

The consignment scheme is traditional and still often practiced across the world in many different forms:

- Freight shipping businesses, in their traditional form, involve consignment arrangements where a captain sells and buys on behalf of another party in a far port
- Securities trading via a securities depository
- Auction houses usually conduct their business through a form of consignment arrangement
- Franchise schemes are a subclass of consignment arrangements
- Second-hand markets can be venues for consignment trade

=== Non-consignment trade ===
- Real estate agents are not working on consignment schemes. The agent is just the arranger of the business; contracts are written directly between the first and the third party (due to real estate registration and tax issues).
- Cross-border triangular trade with a sales agent is usually not consignment trade. This is because the goods typically never leave the supplier, who sends the goods directly to the third-party customer.

The traditional form of shipping business, where a captain sells and buys on consignment schemes on behalf of another party in a distant port from another nation, is generally no longer possible, due to customs and VAT regulations.

=== International trade aspects ===
Internationally, this previously common form of consignment trade is now quite rare. This is because there are major legal, tax-related, and accounting difficulties in conducting cross-border consignment trade. Modern uses of consignment are typically domestic.

=== Law and accounting definitions ===
In business law and accounting, the concept of consignment trade has particular meaning.

The legal conditions of consignment trade have been clear since ancient times.

=== In inventory control ===
Consignment inventory is a stock control model whereby the retailer sells the goods but the ownership remains with the supplier only till the products are sold. The retailer therefore only pays for the products he has sold and he is not required to purchase the goods. Beforehand, the two parties may have sign a consignment agreement with the terms like how long will the unsold goods take before being returned.

== Features ==
- In consignment agreement the possession of goods transfer from one party to another.
- The relation between the two parties is that of consignor and consignee, not that of buyer and seller.
- The consignor is entitled to receive all the expenses in connection with consignment.
- The consignee is not responsible for damage of goods during transport or any other procedure.
- Goods are sold at the risk of the consignor with profit or loss belonging to the consignor only.

A consignor who consigns goods to a consignee transfers only possession, not ownership, of the goods to the consignee. The consignor retains title to the goods. The consignee takes possession of the goods subject to a trust. If the consignee converts the goods to a use not contemplated in the consignment agreement, such as by selling them and keeping the proceeds of the sale for the consignee, the crime of conversion has been committed.

The word consignment comes from the French consigner, meaning "to hand over or transmit", originally from the Latin consignor "to affix a seal", as it was done with official documents just before being sent.

1. in return for the service of consignee, commission is paid to him by Consignor

== Second-hand shops ==
"Consignment shop" is an American term for shops, usually second-hand, that sell used goods for owners (consignors), typically at a lower cost than new goods. Not all second-hand shops are consignment shops, and not all consignment shops are second-hand shops. In consignment shops, it is usually understood that the consignee (the seller) pays the consignor (the person who owns the item) a portion of the proceeds from the sale. Payment is not made until and unless the item sells. Such shops are found around the world. They can be chain stores, like the Buffalo Exchange or individual boutique stores. The consignor retains title to the item and can end the arrangement at any time by requesting its return. A specified time is commonly arranged after which if the item does not sell, the owner is expected to reclaim it (if it is not reclaimed within a specified period, the seller can dispose of the item at discretion).

Merchandise often sold through consignment shops includes antiques, athletic equipment, automobiles, books, clothing (especially children's, maternity, and wedding clothing, which are often not worn out), furniture, firearms, music, musical instruments, tools, paragliders and toys. eBay, drop-off stores and online sellers often use the consignment model of selling. Art galleries, as well, often operate as consignees of the artist.

The consignment process can be further facilitated by the use of vendor managed inventory (VMI) and customer managed inventory (CMI) applications. VMI is a business model that allows the vendor in a vendor-customer relationship to plan and control inventory for the customer, and CMI allows the customer in the relationship to have control of inventory.

Consignment shops differ from charity or thrift shops in which the original owners surrender both physical possession and legal title to the item as a charitable donation, and the seller retains all proceeds from the sale. They also differ from pawn shops in which the original owner can surrender physical possession (but not legal title) of the item in exchange for a loan and then reclaim the item upon repayment of the loan with interest (or else surrender legal title to the item), or alternatively can surrender both physical possession and legal title for an immediate payment; the pawn shop would retain all proceeds from any subsequent sale.

In the UK, the term "consignment" is not used, and consignment shops that sell women's clothing are called "dress agencies". Although the other types of consignment shop exist, there is no general term for them.

=== Procedure ===
A consignor brings their second-hand items in to be reviewed.

After the review, the consignee will return those items deemed unsuitable for resale to the consignor (such as torn or dirty items or items deemed to be fakes, which cannot be sold in some jurisdictions), accept those to be resold, and establish the target resale price, the consignee's share of it, and the length of time the items will be held for sale.

When a consignor's items sell (or in some cases, after the agreed-upon period ends), the consignee takes a share of the profits and pays the consignor the share. Items that are not sold are returned to the consignor (who must retrieve them within a set time or forfeit title to them; in some cases, the consignor may agree ahead of time to allow the consignee to donate them to charity).

== Accounting ==
When a vendor (consignor) provides goods on consignment to a distributor (consignee) then revenue cannot be recognized when control has transferred. This could occur at the expiration of a specified consignment period, or the sale of an item to an end-consumer. The SEC has provided examples of consignment arrangements in question 2 of SAB Topic 13.A.2 including the following:

- A customer's obligation to pay is implicitly excused until consumption or sale
- The seller has an obligation to bring about resale
- A repurchase price exists that will be adjusted for holding costs and interest

Accounting Standards Codification (ASC) 606-10-55-80 (implemented for public companies December 15, 2017) provides three indicators of the presence of consignment arrangement that provides the principles behind the examples that the SEC has outlined. These indicators are as follows:

- The vendor controls the product until a specified event occurs, such as the sale to an end-customer, or until a specified period expires.
- The vendor is able to require the return of the product or transfer of the product to a third party.
- The consignee does not have an unconditional obligation to pay for the product (although it may be required pay a deposit).

This list of indicators of a consignment arrangement is not all-inclusive, so companies should also consider other indicators of the transfer of control found in ASC 606-10-25-30.

== See also ==
- Consignment agreement
- Manufacturing
- Distribution
- Logistics, Transportation
- Just in time
- Vendor-managed inventory
- Scan-based trading
