= ING Bank Śląski =

Polish bank

ING Bank Śląski S.A.
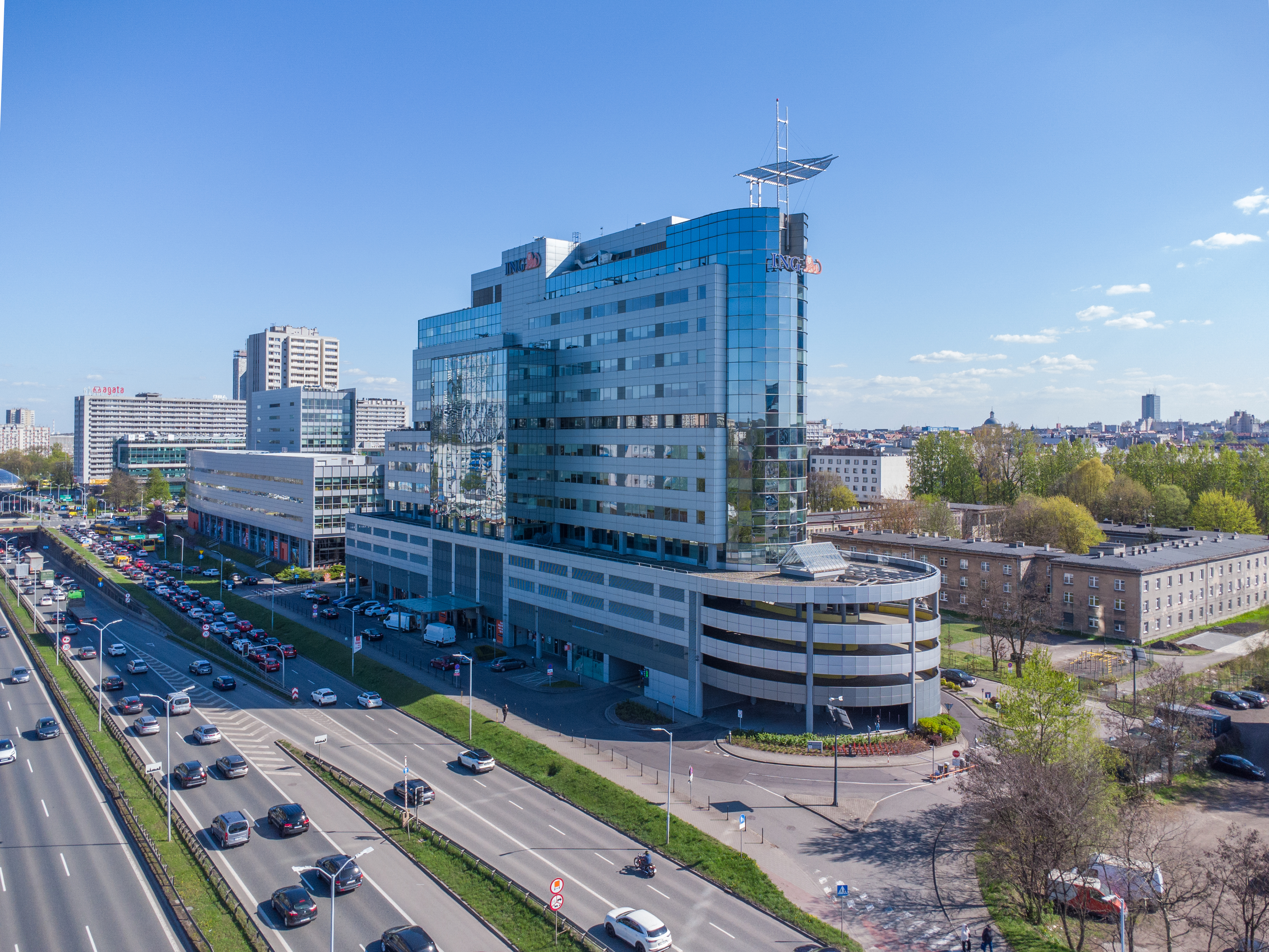
- ING Bank Śląski headquarters on Sokolska Street in downtown Katowice
- Trade name: ING Bank
- Formerly: Bank Śląski
- Type: Spółka Akcyjna
- Traded as: WSE: ING
- Industry: Financial services
- Founded: April 11, 1988; 38 years ago in Katowice, Poland
- Founder: National Bank of Poland
- Headquarters: Katowice, Poland
- Key people: Michał Bolesławski (CEO); Joanna Erdman (VP, CRO); Marcin Giżycki (VP); Bożena Graczyk (VP, CFO); Marcin Kościński (VP); Maciej Ogórkiewicz (VP, CIO); Wojciech Sieńczyk (VP); Agnieszka Wolska (VP); Alicja Żyła (VP, COO)
- Revenue: ▲PLN 11.854 B (2025)
- Operating income: 1,335,900,000 złoty (2014)
- Net income: ▲PLN 4.633 B (2025)
- Total assets: ▲PLN 282.025 B (2025)
- Total equity: ▲PLN 21.342 B (2025)
- Owner: ING Bank N.V. (75%)
- Number of employees: 7,646 (2025)
- Parent: ING Group
- Subsidiaries: ING Investment Holding (Polska); ING Lease (Polska); ING Commercial Finance Polska; Paymento Financial; ING Bank Hipoteczny; ING Usługi dla Biznesu; Nowe Usługi; SAIO; Goldman Sachs TFI; Dom Data IDS
- Website: ing.pl

ING Bank Śląski (Polish: ING Silesian Bank, pronounced [ɕlɔ̃ski], ING BSK), known until 2001 as Bank Śląski, is a universal bank headquartered in Katowice, Poland, providing retail, corporate and institutional banking services. Established in 1989, it has been majority-owned by Dutch banking corporation ING Group since 1996.

By 2023, it was the fifth bank in Poland by total assets. In the second quarter of 2021, the bank served over 4.3 million retail customers and over 504,000 corporate clients. As of the first quarter of 2025, it served 4.62 million retail customers and 575,000 corporate clients. At the end of 2025, it ranked third in Poland by both loans (PLN 181.2 billion) and deposits (PLN 233.4 billion), and served 4.7 million retail and 594,000 corporate clients.

== History ==
=== Founding and privatization ===
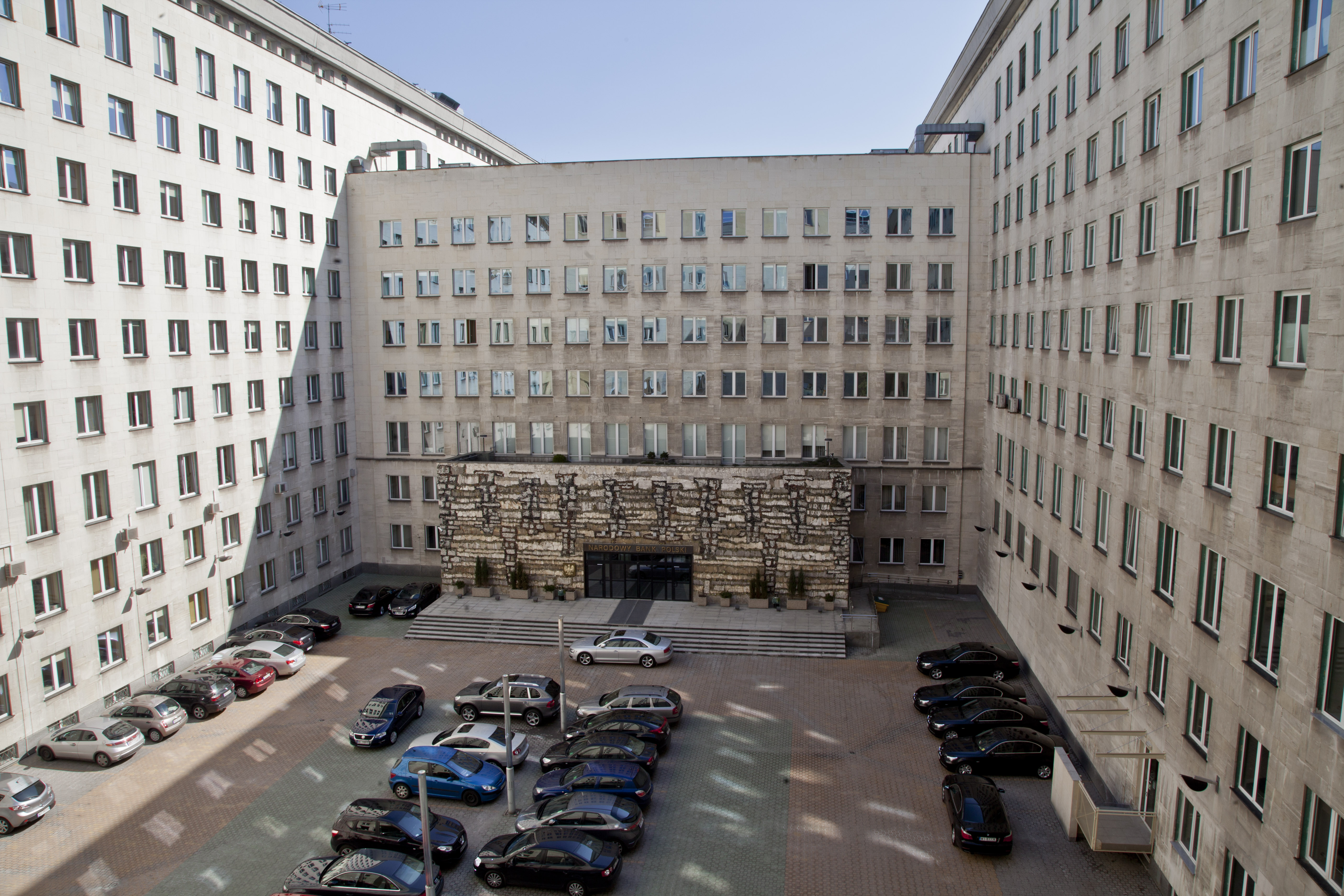
Headquarters courtyard of the National Bank of Poland on Świętokrzyska Street in Warsaw

Bank Śląski was legally established under a Council of Ministers regulation of 11 April 1988, and started operations on 1 February 1989, as one of nine banks spun off in the late 1980s from the National Bank of Poland (NBP). The change was part of the reforms during the 1989 political transition, when central-bank functions in the country's single-tier banking system were separated from commercial banking. Bank Śląski was the second-largest of the Nine by assets – roughly twice those of Wielkopolski Bank Kredytowy – and one of the first two earmarked for privatization. In October 1991, Bank Śląski was transformed from a state bank into a joint-stock company wholly owned by the State Treasury. On 13 January 1994, the State Treasury began the bank's privatization by selling a 25.9% stake (2.4 million shares, for US$ 60 million) to Amsterdam-based ING Bank N.V. ING was bound to hold the stake for at least three years; the State retained 33%.

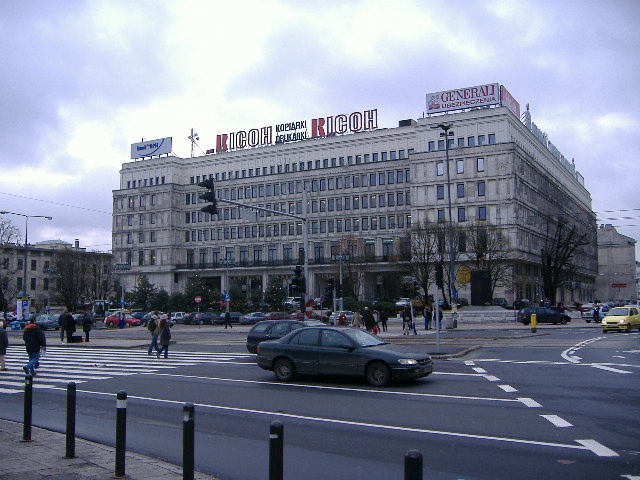
Former House of the Party in Warsaw during the 1990s, when it was home to the Warsaw Stock Exchange

Later that month, on 25 January 1994, the bank's shares debuted on the Warsaw Stock Exchange – a listing that proved controversial. The issue price was 13.5 times lower than the price set at the first trading session, enabling rapid, high profits for buyers. Bank employees, who received shares at a preferential price and without the reductions applied to other buyers, held the largest individual allotments. At the same time, a high volume of subscriptions from more than 800,000 investors unconnected to ING led to substantial allotment reductions, down to three shares per person. Of the shares on offer, 45% were allotted through an institutional tender (minimum bid corresponding to a 2% stake, capped at 25% per investor), 15% were reserved for small investors and 10% for employees, with the State Treasury retaining the rest.

=== Controversy over the share issue ===
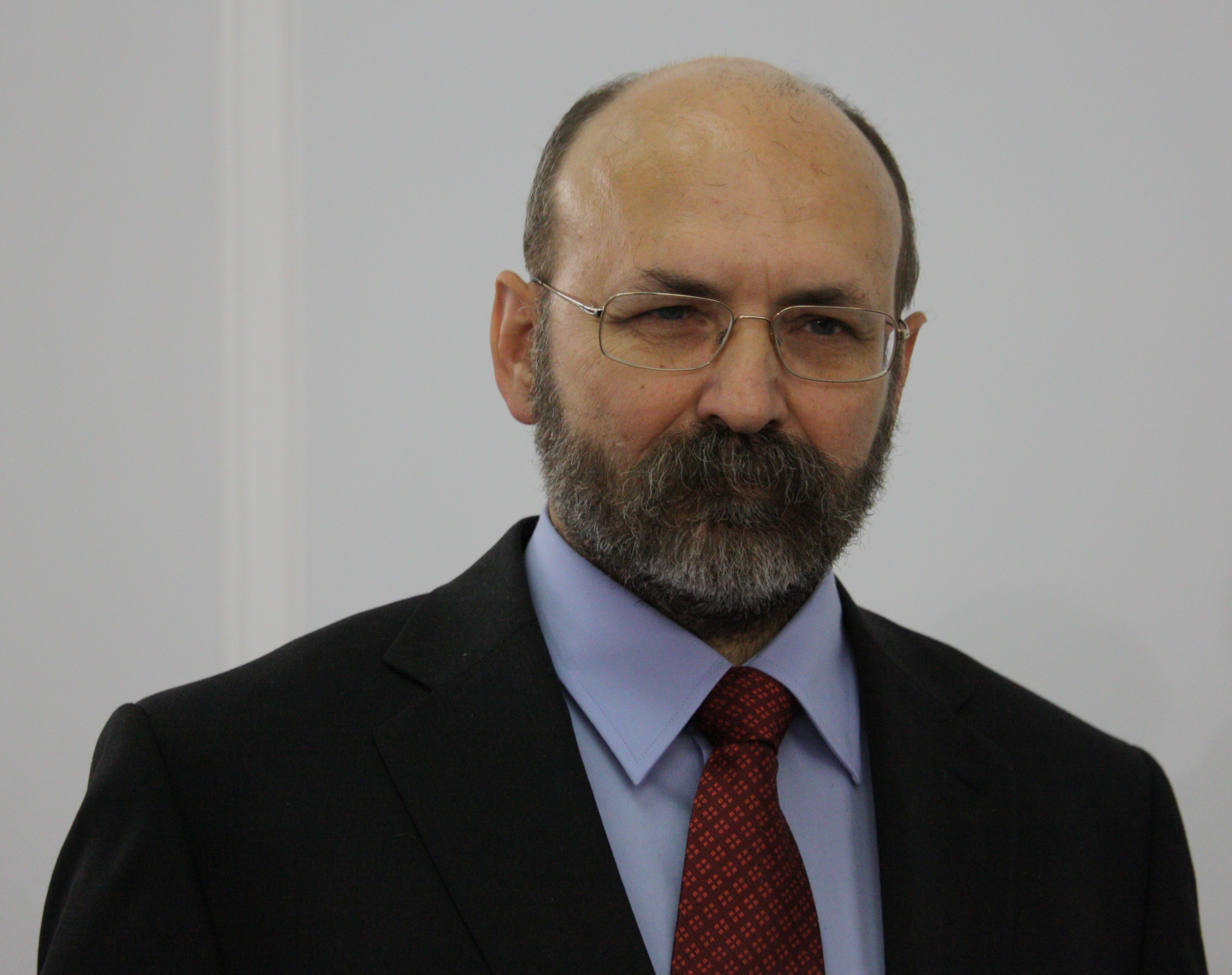
Focal accusation point against the 1994 privatization process of Bank Śląski was the "Pęk list," after the Sejm deputy Bogdan Pęk alleged that some of the bank's shareholders were politically connected. Later, the Supreme Audit Office president Lech Kaczyński denied in the Sejm that such list ever existed

As Bank Śląski had the most extensive network of brokerage offices in Poland, prosecutors opened an investigation into whether its authorities had colluded to inflate the share price, and the Securities Commission (KPW) stripped it of its brokerage license. It was restored within weeks but with restrictions, and KPW imposed a PLN 500,000 fine on the bank, twice, after another investigation — citing incomplete reporting on remedial measures and inadequate internal oversight, the maximum short of revoking the license outright.

The controversy surrounding the first weeks of trading led the supervisory board to dismiss the bank's founding president Marian Rajczyk, a career NBP official, in spring 1994. Prime Minister Waldemar Pawlak also dismissed the deputy finance minister, who had overseen the privatization process, without consulting minister Marek Borowski; Borowski himself subsequently resigned. Sejm deputy Bogdan Pęk alleged losses "in the billions"; the Supreme Audit Office (NIK), then headed by Lech Kaczyński, concluded that responsibility for the mishandled operation was shared among the bank's management, the Securities Commission, the exchange's management, and finance-ministry officials. The same year, the Sejm's special committee reviewing the sale rejected most of the allegations, and found no evidence for a list of politically connected buyers, concluded the issue price had been properly set, and the bank not undervalued.

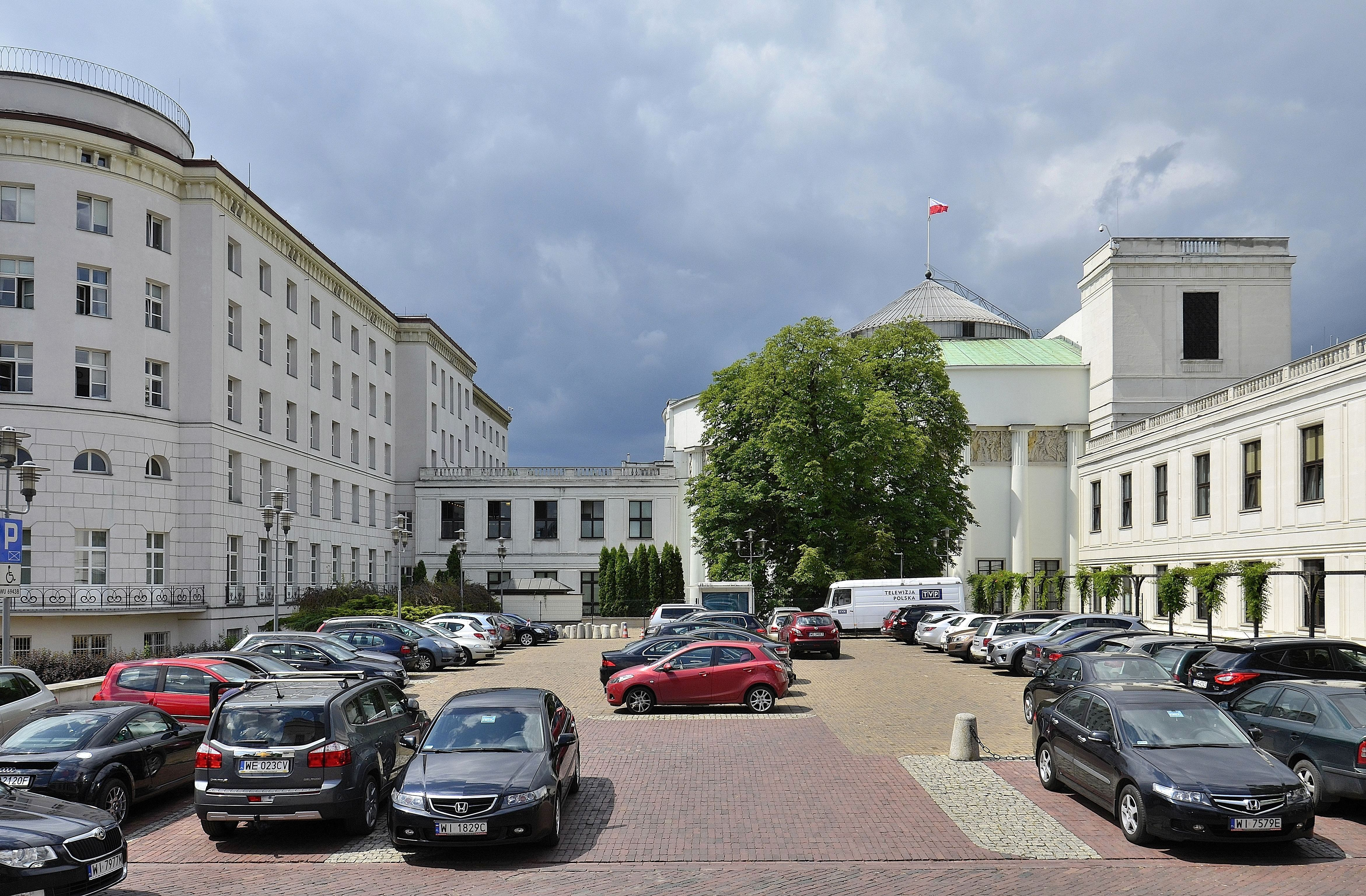
The Sejm complex in Warsaw, the lower house of the Polish parliament, where two special committees reviewed the privatization of Bank Śląski

According to NIK's own findings, the finance ministry had set the issue price too low (500,000 against a first-session price of 6,750,000 old złoty) and had "cooled" the market by selling 95% of the Treasury's remaining stake at capped prices; several officials denied deliberate manipulation. An economist asked for a review concluded the issue price had been set appropriately. In 1995, the chairman of the Sejm committee said "there [was] no Bank Śląski affair." The privatization was the subject of prosecutorial proceedings and criminal trials, which did not result in convictions, as well as independent audits by the Securities Commission, the Supreme Audit Office, and another parliamentary Committee on Banks and Banking Supervision, active from 2006 to 2007. Civil lawsuits brought against the bank in connection with these events did result in judgments against it. Rajczyk denied wrongdoing and rejected the "Bank Śląski affair" characterization in his 2014 book.

=== Sale to ING ===
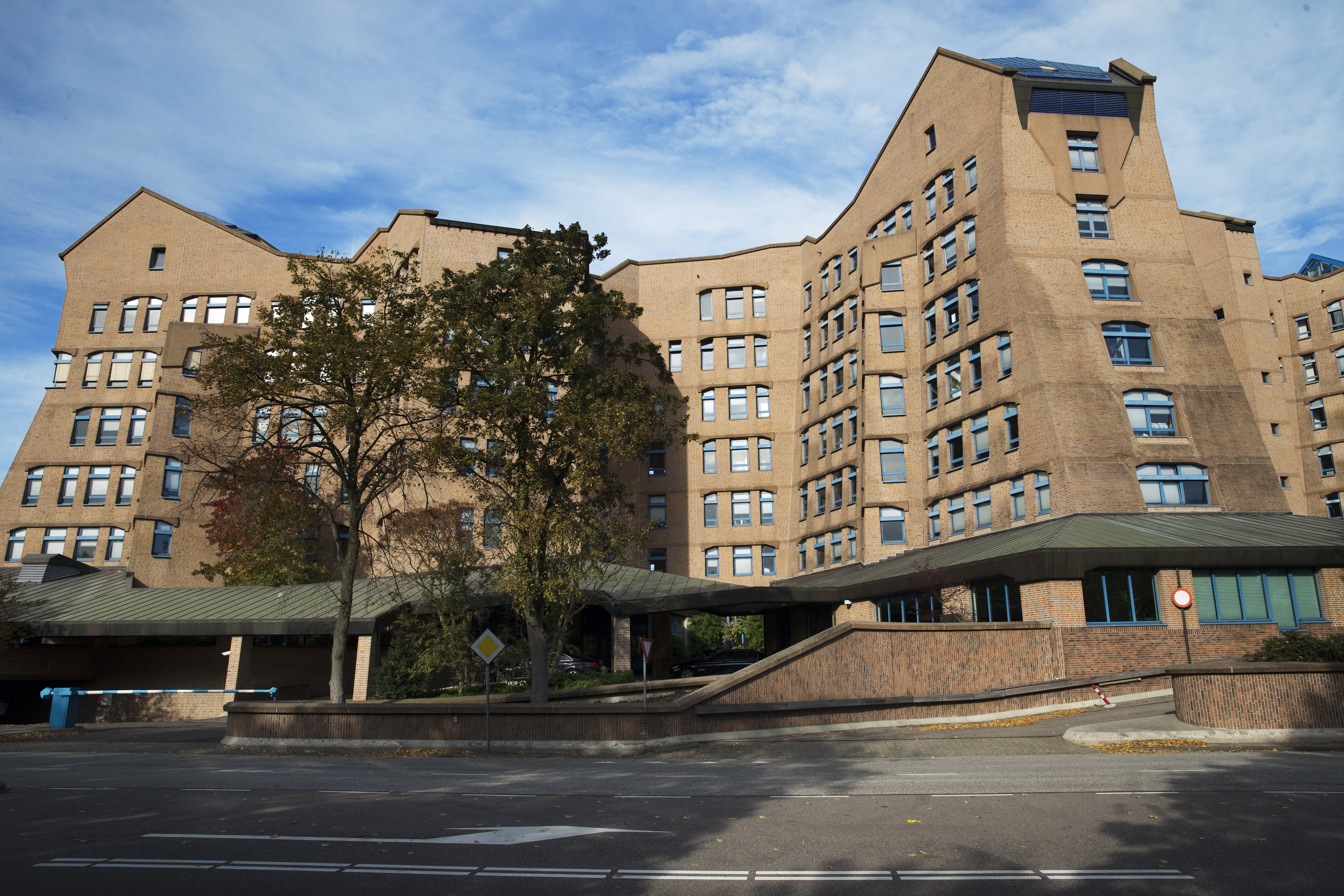
The Amsterdamse Poort, the former Amsterdam headquarters of the ING Group from the time of acquiring Bank Śląski

In 1996, following two off-exchange share-sale transactions by the State Treasury, ING became the bank's majority shareholder of Bank Śląski. ING first offered, in May 1996, to buy a further 27.2% of share capital at 210 złoty per share, for at least PLN 528.9 million (US$195 million); when the sale was finalized weeks later the stake purchased had grown to 28.1%, raising ING's total holding to 54.1% (1,937,000 shares), and making it the first fully completed privatization of a major Polish bank. The remaining shares were held by the Templeton fund (5%), the State Treasury (5%) and small shareholders (35.9%). In 2000, the bank established a specialist mortgage bank under the name Śląski Bank Hipoteczny.

ING was itself formed on 4 March 1991 through the merger of the banking group NMB Postbank Groep with the insurer Nationale-Nederlanden, creating a combined bancassurance conglomerate that has since grown into one of Europe's largest financial-services groups. The Wall Street Journal described ING's 1994 entry into Bank Śląski as marking Central Europe's first large-bank privatization to draw a private foreign strategic investor. The paper reported that ING was positioning the bank for a leading role in the group's growth strategy in Poland.

=== Corporate expansion ===
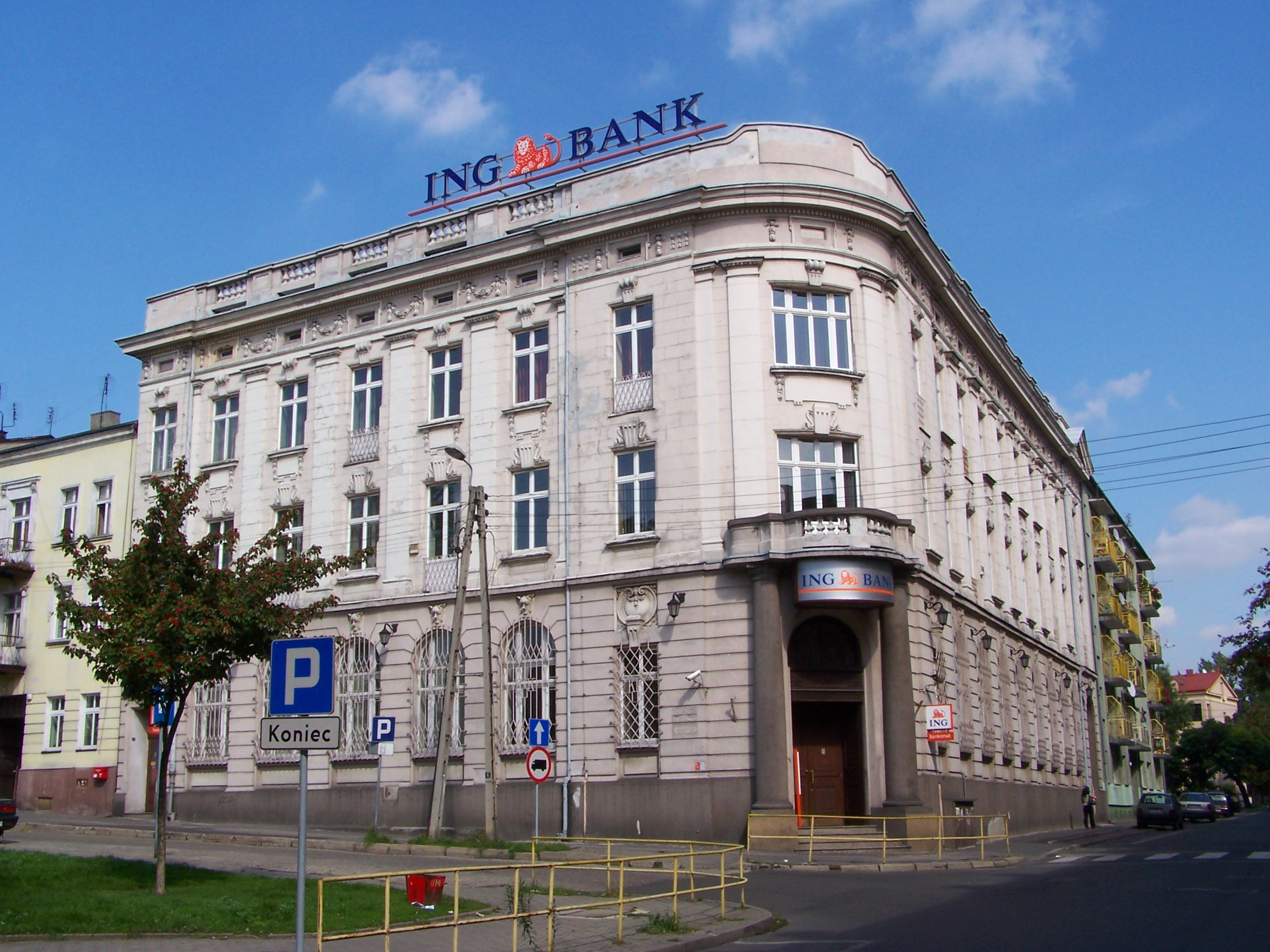
ING Bank Śląski branch in Będzin, in southern Poland, pictured in 2006

In mid-2000, ING surveyed customers of the bank on its rename; with two names under consideration including ING Bank Polska, and the bank's existing logo. In mid-2001, shareholders approved authorizing the issue of 3.75 million new shares in exchange for ING's own Warsaw branch, contributed in kind and valued at PLN 993.75 million. In September, the merged entity started operating as ING Bank Śląski. The enlarged bank's own capital stood at about PLN 2.5 billion, on 2000 net profit of PLN 248 million. Then-president Marian Czakański described the merger as part of a shift from a regional to a nationwide bank, with expansion focused on Warsaw, Poznań and the Tricity; in 2000 the bank had gained 145,000 individual customers, raising its checking-account base to 842,000 and its branch network to 320, with the ATM network – from 381 to 450.

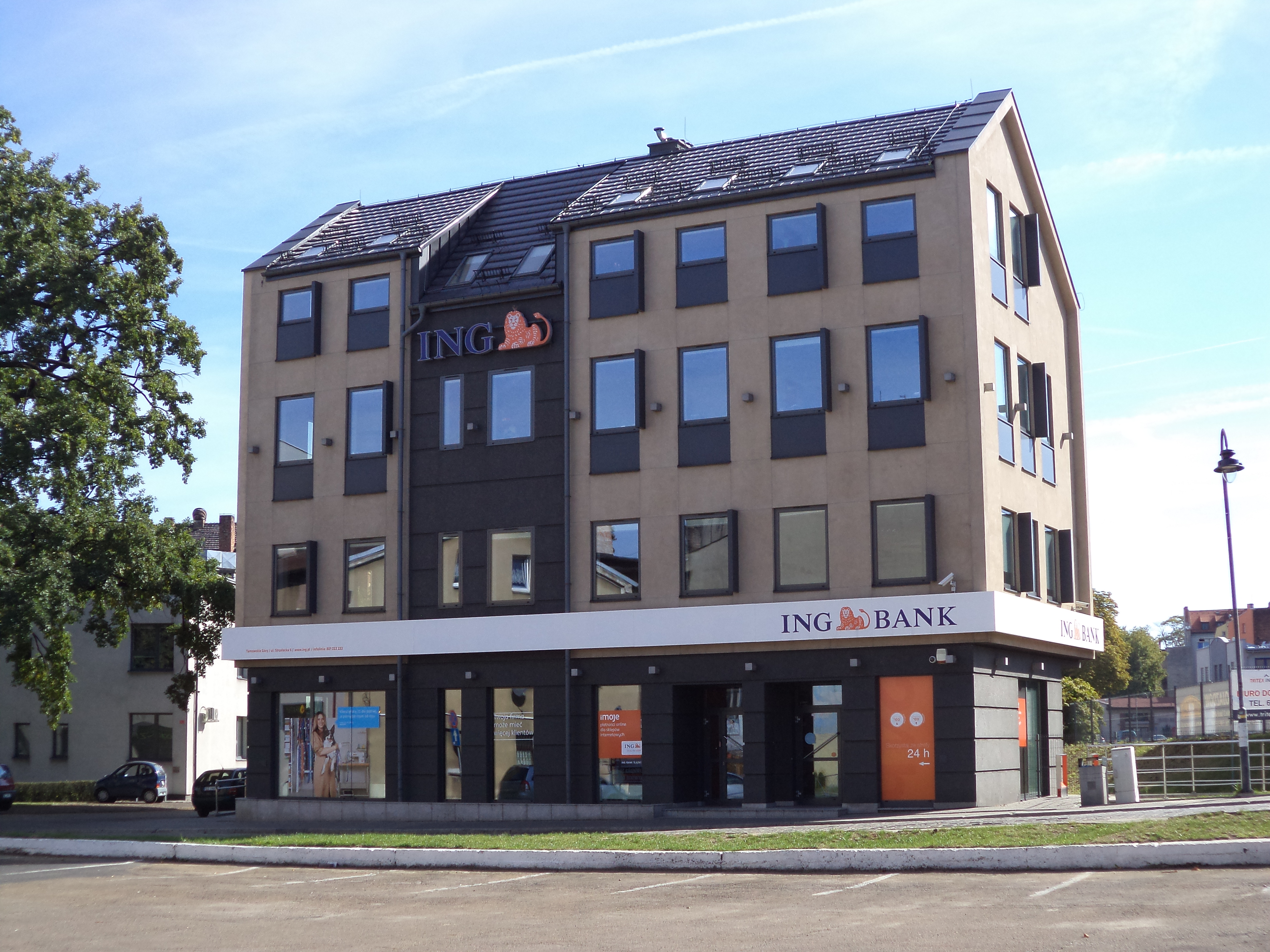
ING Bank Śląski branch in Silesian city Tarnowskie Góry, pictured in 2018

In March 2005, honoring an earlier commitment to the Polish regulator, ING Bank N.V. sold its shares on the WSE, reducing its stake from 87.77% to 75%. In the same year, by decision of the Banking Supervision Commission, the bank assumed administration of Wielkopolski Bank Rolniczy owing to its poor financial condition and subsequently absorbed it. At the time, the bank introduced the instant-access savings account, one of the first such products among Polish major banks.

In 2008, the mortgage subsidiary Śląski Bank Hipoteczny was renamed ING Bank Hipoteczny. In 2013, it was absorbed into ING Bank Śląski. A new mortgage bank, again named ING Bank Hipoteczny, began operating in 2019.

In 2013, ING Bank Śląski was one of six founding shareholder banks – alongside PKO Bank Polski, mBank, Bank Millennium, Alior Bank, and Bank Zachodni WBK – of the Polish Payment Standard (Polski Standard Płatności) consortium, which built the Blik mobile-payments system. Blik launched in February 2015. By July 2021, when contactless Blik payments began rolling out, the service was usable by more than 95% of Polish banking-app users, and Mastercard had joined PSP's shareholders.

In 2017, ING Bank Śląski took over an insolvent credit union Bieszczadzka SKOK in Sanok. Within the ING network, the Polish subsidiary's standing continued to rise: from the fifth-largest bank in Poland by assets in 2024 (PLN 260.36 billion, 7.75% market share, PLN 4,369 million net income) to third-largest by loans and deposits in 2025.

=== Recent developments ===
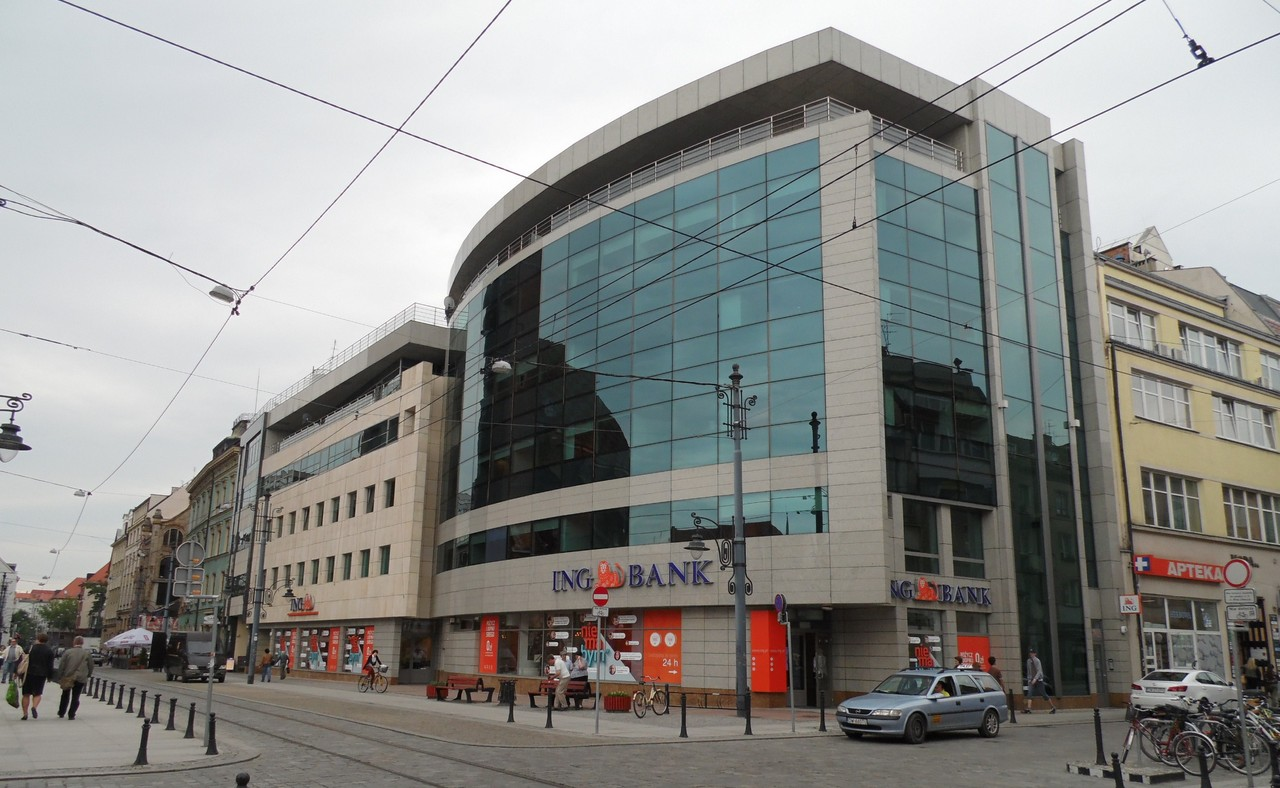
ING offices on Szewska Street in Wrocław, pictured in 2014

In April 2025, a dedicated private-banking division was split out of the bank's business-clients unit for the bank's "affluent" clients, a segment it projected would multiply in size over the following years, partly owing to business-succession processes affecting an estimated 80,000 Polish firms.

In November 2025, ING BSK announced an agreement with Goldman Sachs to acquire the remaining 55% stake in Polish asset management company Goldman Sachs TFI and therefore take full control of the company (ING BSK already hold a 45% stake). The purchase was approved by the European Commission in February 2026. The transaction was completed in April 2026 for PLN 405 million, and the acquired company was renamed ING TFI, restoring a name the asset manager had originally carried decades earlier. Its funds held PLN 60 billion in total assets at the time.

On 22 April 2026, the bank replaced its personal-account range with a subscription-style lineup of four tiers, offering an increasing scope of fee waivers and foreign-exchange, travel and insurance benefits at higher tiers. In April 2026, the bank launched a digital mortgage-application process through its Moje ING app; it aims to process nearly all mortgage applications digitally, without displacing the credit intermediaries. At the time, ING held an 18% share of the Polish mortgage market.

== Shareholders ==
Share capital of ING Bank Śląski amounts to PLN 130,100,000, divided into 92,600,000 series A shares and 37,500,000 series B shares, each with a nominal value of PLN 1; each share carries one vote at the General Meeting. As of 30 June 2026, shareholder structure is as follows:

- ING Bank N.V. – 75.00% (97,575,000 shares)
- Allianz Polska Otwarty Fundusz Emerytalny – 5.98% (7,782,036 shares)
- Nationale-Nederlanden OFE – 5.60% (7,282,649 shares)
- Other exchange investors – 13.42% (17,460,315 shares).

== Key people ==
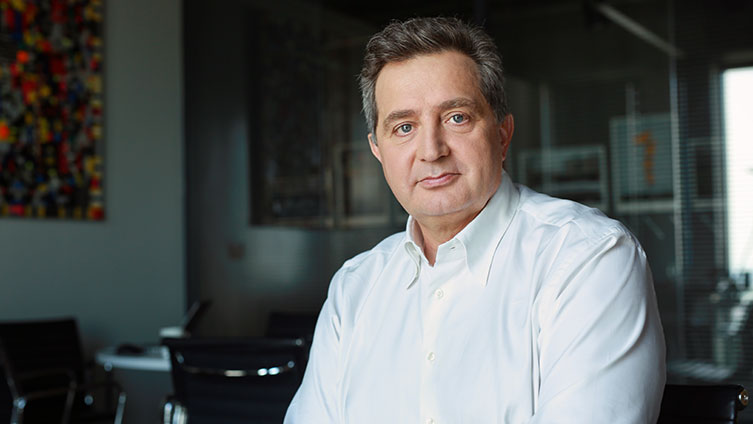
Brunon Bartkiewicz served three terms as CEO of ING Bank Śląski between 1995 and 2025

Management-board succession at ING Bank Śląski has included Rajczyk (1988/1991–1994). In May 1995, he was succeeded by Brunon Bartkiewicz, then aged 32, who had joined the bank in April 1991 to build its brokerage house and IT systems and had gone on to oversee privatization preparations.

In 2000, he was succeeded by Czakański, who served until 2004, when Bartkiewicz returned as president for a second term, followed in 2010 by Małgorzata Kołakowska (2010–2016). Kołakowska had served as Vice-President since 2008 before becoming President in 2010. Bartkiewicz's departure at the end of 2009 came as ING Groep faced EU-mandated restructuring after receiving €10 billion in Dutch state aid earlier that year; he moved to ING's Amsterdam headquarters to head online banking for several Western European markets.

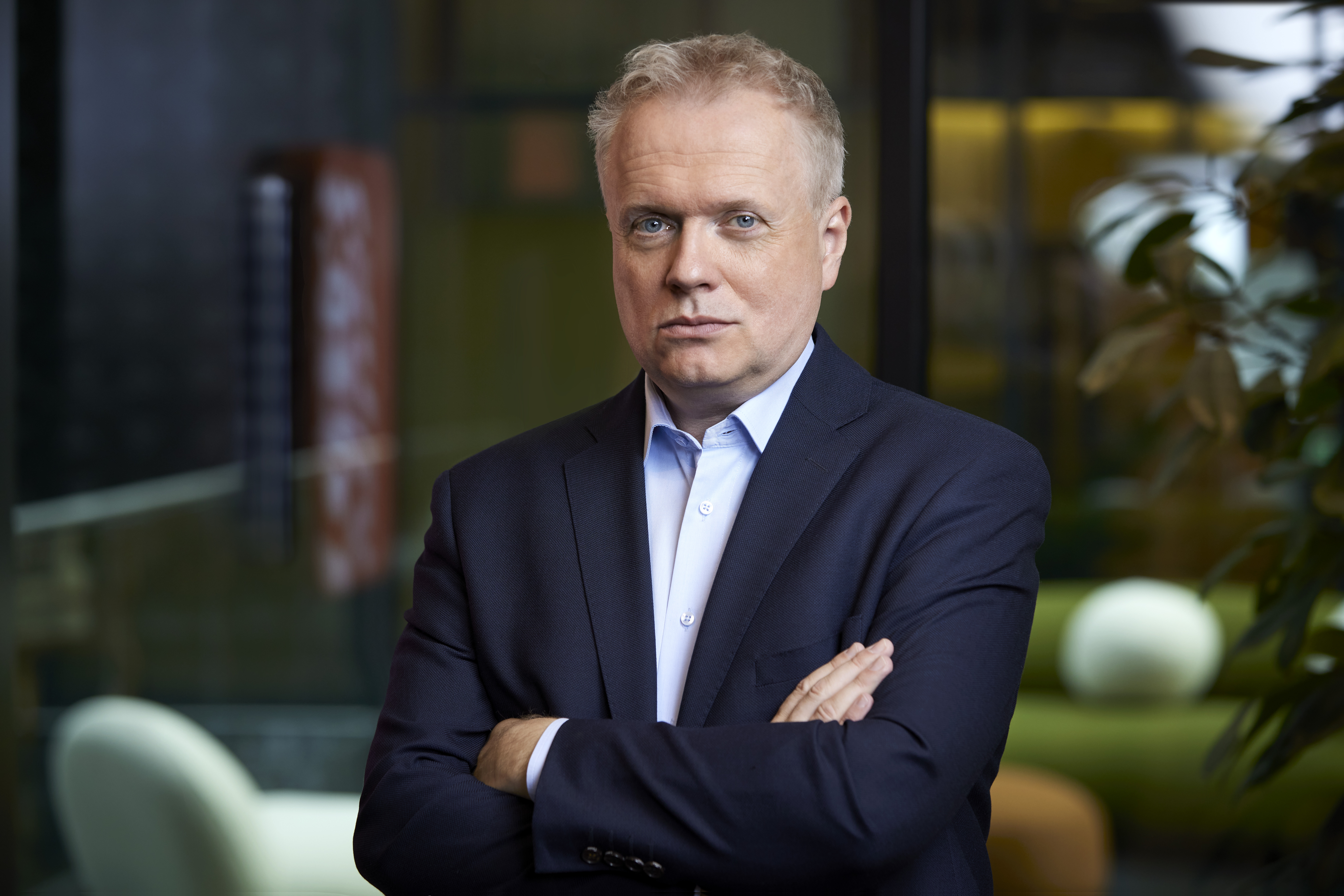
Michał Bolesławski, CEO of ING Bank Śląski since April 2025

In March 2016, Kołakowska resigned to become Global Head of Network for Wholesale Banking at ING Group. The same year, Bartkiewicz returned as president for a third term. Between his terms in Poland, Bartkiewicz held the role of chief executive of ING Direct's European operations. In September 2024, the Supervisory Board appointed Michał Bolesławski as president. He took office on 29 April 2025, ending Bartkiewicz's third term. Bolesławski had worked in ING BSK since 2000, serving as Vice-President for Business Clients from 2008 to 2021, before spending 2021–2025 in ING's international structures, including as global head of the group's Business Banking division from January 2023.

== Subsidiaries ==
ING Bank Śląski forms a capital group of its own, with subsidiaries spanning factoring, leasing, mortgage lending, corporate, and accounting services, and business process automation. Listed here in the order in which they were founded or joined the group:

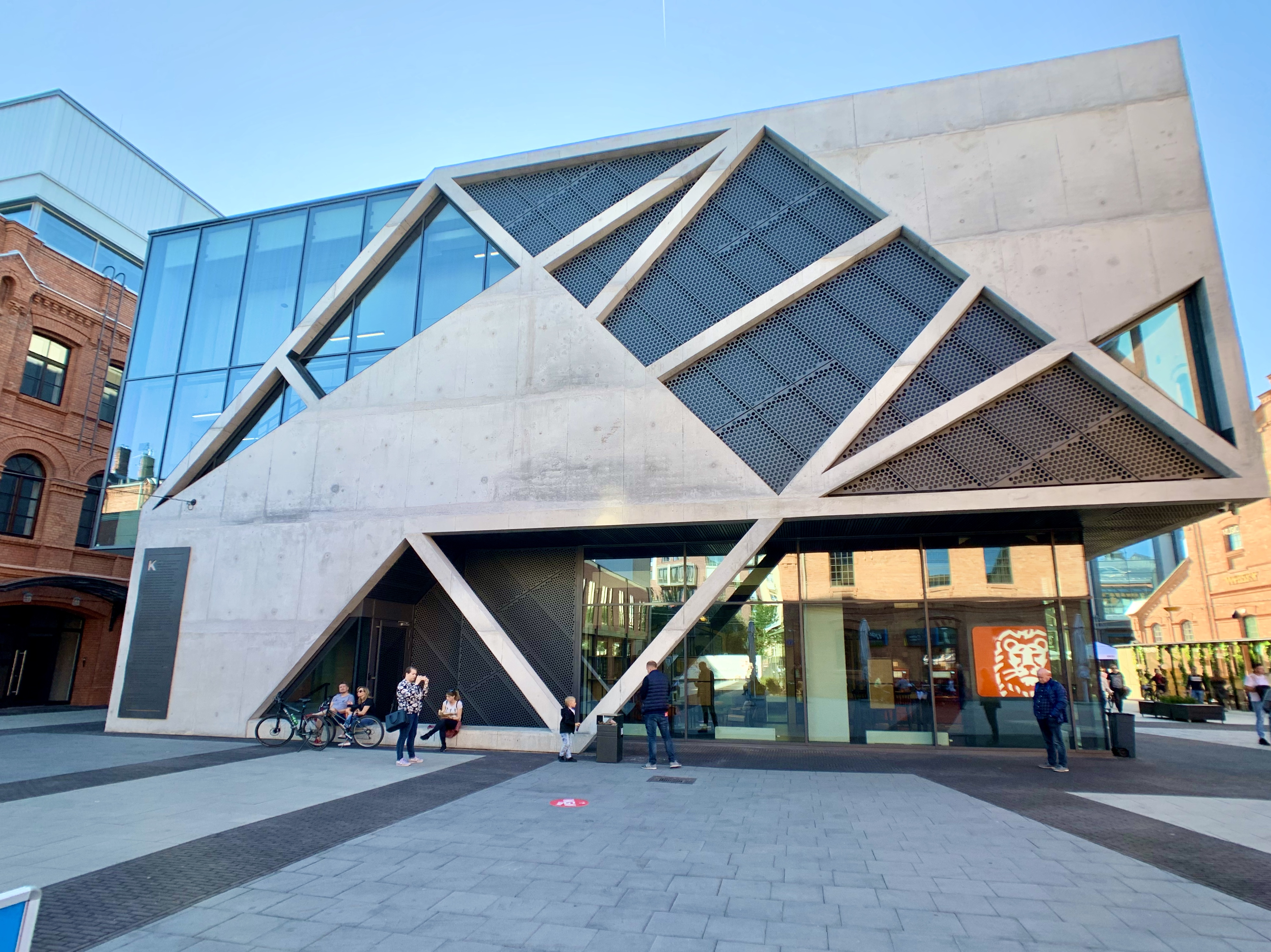
Branch of ING Bank Śląski in the Praga Koneser Center complex in Warsaw

- ING Faktoring, formerly ING Commercial Finance Polska – Poland's first dedicated factoring company, registered in 1994; joined the ING Group brand in 2006 and became part of the bank's own Capital Group in 2012.
- ING Leasing, formerly ING Lease (Polska), operating on the leasing market since 1995; part of the bank's capital group since 2012.
- ING Bank Hipoteczny, mortgage bank that traces to Śląski Bank Hipoteczny, established in 2000 (see: History).
- ING Investment Holding (Polska), holding vehicle created during the 2011 restructuring. Its own financial services subsidiary Paymento Financial, acquired in January 2023, provides online payment services for e-commerce companies.
- ING Usługi dla Biznesu, Business Services, registered in January 2012, that include an online trading and tender platform Aleo launched in 2013, an accounting service ING Księgowość, and a bill-payment platform Moje Usługi.
- SAIO, robotic process automation company, grew out of the bank's internal robotic-process-automation program launched in 2016, spun off as a separate joint-stock company (share capital PLN 3 million) in October 2022. In 2024, it doubled its revenue and headcount year-on-year, and had deployed over 2,000 automation "robots" for corporate and small-business clients.
- Nowe Usługi, investor-education and capital-markets promotion activities operator, including the Edukacja Giełdowa (Stock Exchange Education) content platform.

=== Other ventures and initiatives ===
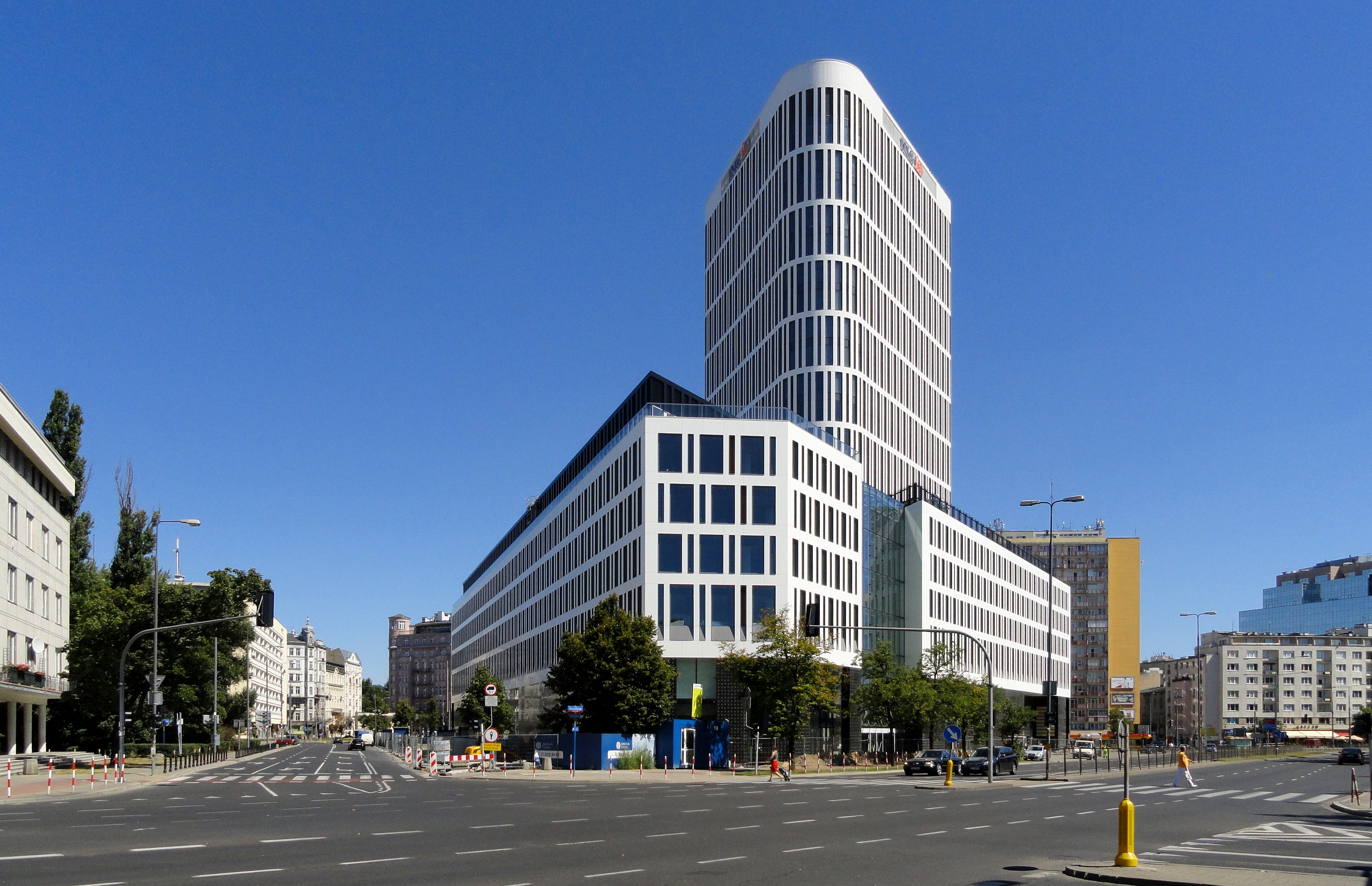
ING main offices at the Plac Unii complex on Puławska Street in Warsaw

in July 2018, ING BSK, in a joint venture with Czech fintech Twisto Payments, launched Twisto Polska, offering short-term deferred payment ("buy now, pay later") integrated into the bank's payment gateway, an initiative built around proprietary credit-scoring algorithm – an alternative to the bank-login "screen scraping" scoring method that KNF had barred domestic banks from using. In November 2020, the partners increased its capital by PLN 17 million. As of August 2026, Twisto remained active in Poland, ranked among the leading deferred-payment providers with 60,000 participating online stores.

In January 2020, the bank acquired an 8% minority stake in Vooom, a Warsaw urban-mobility-as-a-service startup for PLN 1 million, aimed at supporting electromobility in Poland.

In summer 2020, the bank launched Investo, a robo-advisory service allocating client funds across four risk-based portfolios. In 2023, press analysis found that, over its first three years, none of the four portfolios had returned more than about 8.6% cumulatively, with some spending multiple quarters in negative territory.

ING Hubs Poland is a shared-services and technology center within the wider ING Group, tracing to an IT centre established in Katowice in the mid-2000s as ING Business Shared Services. It provides cybersecurity, credit-risk modelling, card processing services, and HR support within ING in over 20 countries. As of 2022, it employed 3,000 people in Katowice and Warsaw, in a global ING Hubs network of 12,500 specialists in Philippines, Romania, Slovakia, and Turkey.

== Headquarters ==
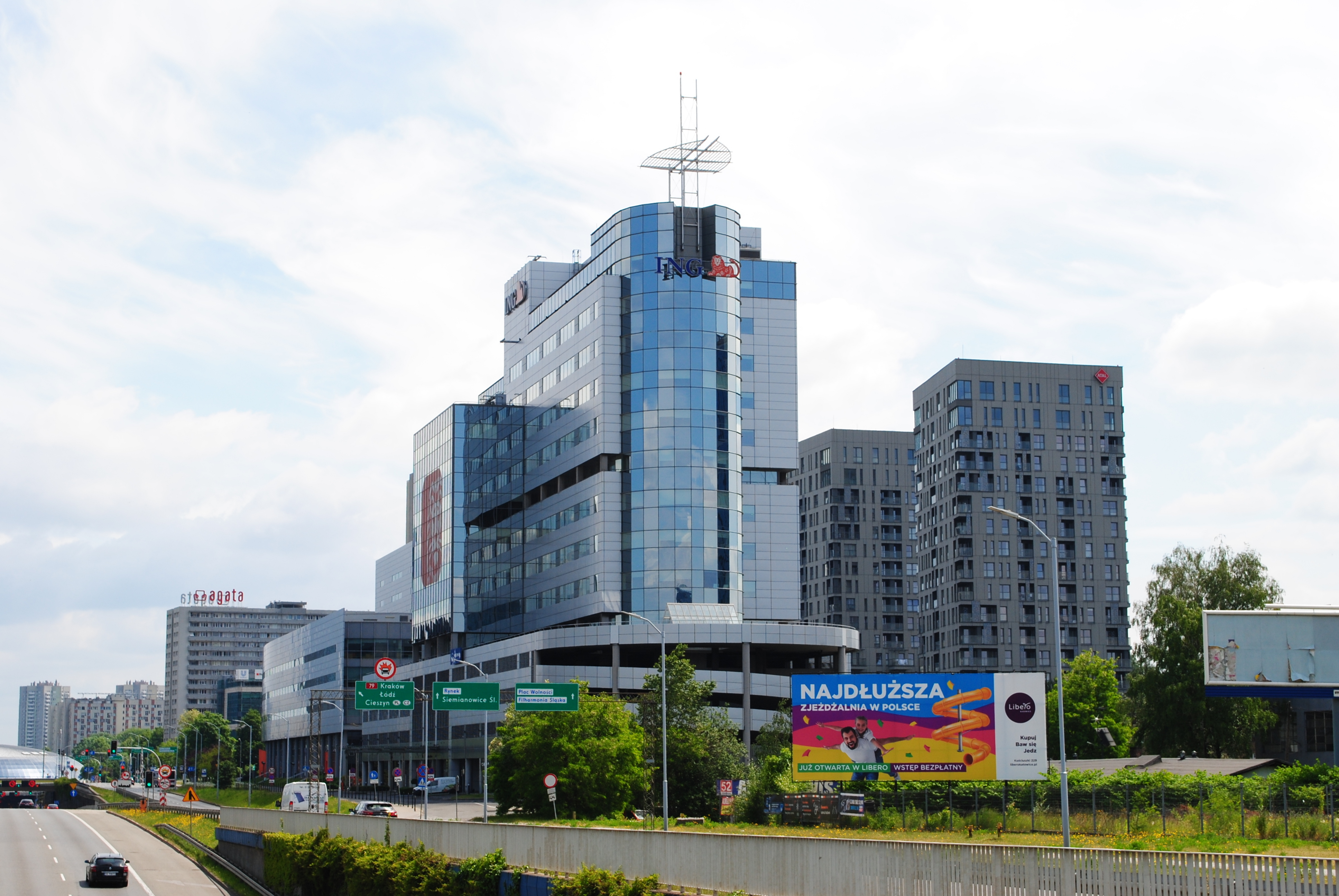
Headquarters complex of ING Bank Śląski in Katowice, designed by Denton Corker Marshall to evoke mine-shaft hoists of the Silesian region's mining heritage

The bank's main offices are located in three adjacent buildings at the corner of Sokolska and Chorzowska streets in central Katowice. Construction began in July 1998 through a joint venture between Bank Śląski and the Belgian construction group Besix, for the cost of 200 million German marks (PLN 400 million). The main tower opened in summer 2000, with a nine-story south tower housing the management board, a four-story north building, an auditorium, and a large glazed atrium. The complex totals 28,000 m² and was built to house 1,000 staff, and lifts running at 1.6 meters per second. An adjoining 15-story commercial annex Chorzowska 50, designed by the Sopot firm MAT, was opened in April 2001.

In January 2026, president Bolesławski said the bank was planning to renovate the complex: with an added façade layer of panels functioning as photovoltaic cells and emit light, or a ceramic-scale façade echoing the exterior of the Headquarters of the Polish National Radio Symphony Orchestra in Katowice. Both variants would enclose the walkway between the two buildings so that staff would no longer need to go outside to move between them.

== Corporate social responsibility ==
=== Environmental policy ===
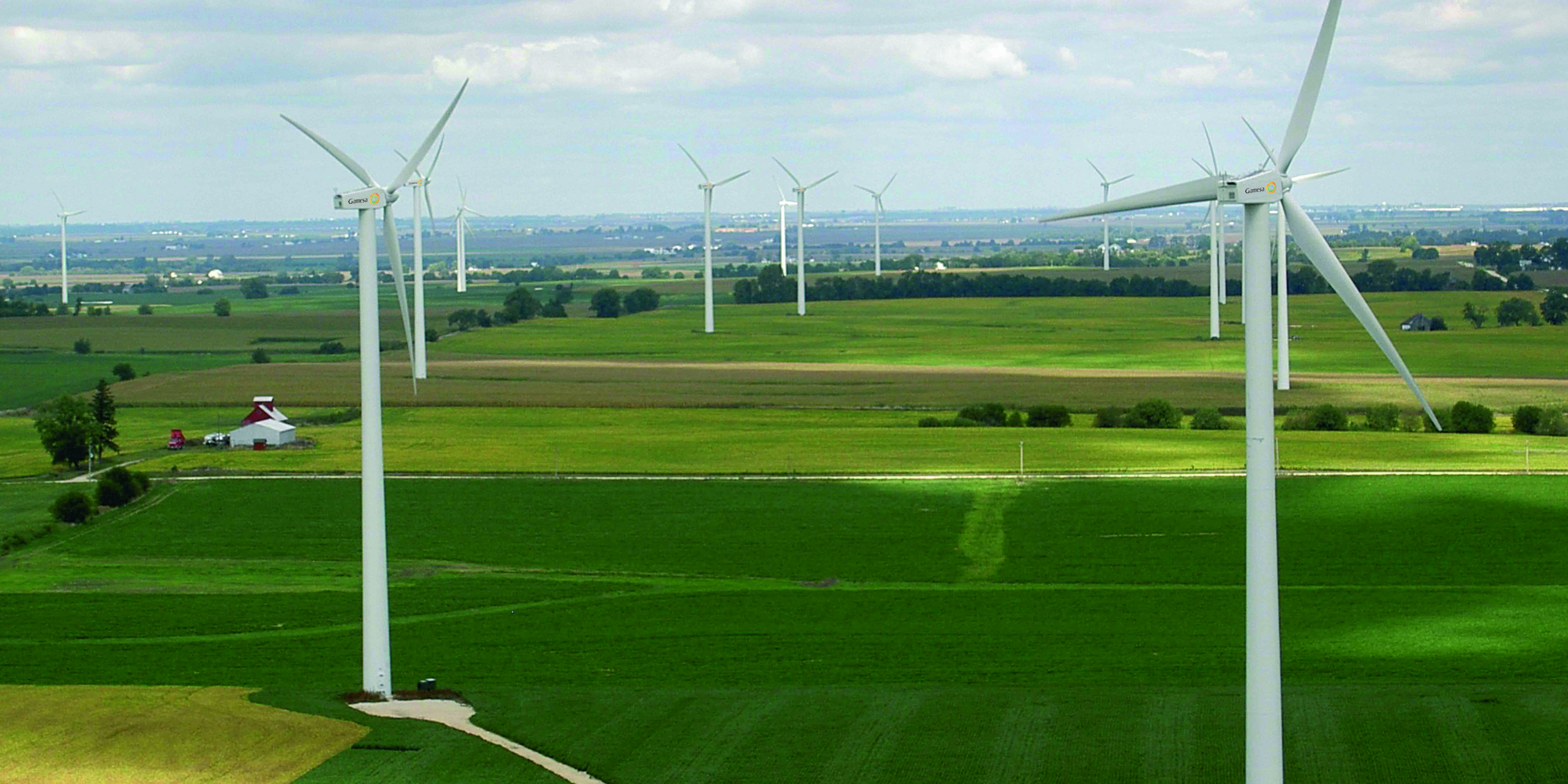
ING Bank Śląski has financed several wind power plant projects in Poland, including one with Siemens Gamesa turbines in the Greater Poland (like those pictured in 2008 in Scotland)

In December 2017, ING Bank Śląski announced that from 2025 it would not finance clients whose activity depends on thermal coal to a degree greater than 5%, would gradually wind down existing credit exposure to coal-fired power plants to zero by 2025, and would extend no new financing to such plants. The bank had already stopped financing new coal-fired power plants in 2015.

ING BSK has been credited as one of relatively few in Poland to report close to the full scope of its indirect ("Scope 3") greenhouse-gas emissions from financed activities – 5.8 million tones of CO₂ in 2022, versus 8,700 tones for its own direct and energy-purchase emissions (Scopes 1 and 2) — and it has pledged PLN 5 billion for renewable-energy financing in its corporate segment between 2024 and 2030. In 2021, the bank launch financing PLN 127 million for the construction of a wind farm in Donaborów, while in 2002 it granted a PLN 242 million loan for the construction of 10 solar and wind farms in Poland.

=== ING Polish Art Foundation ===
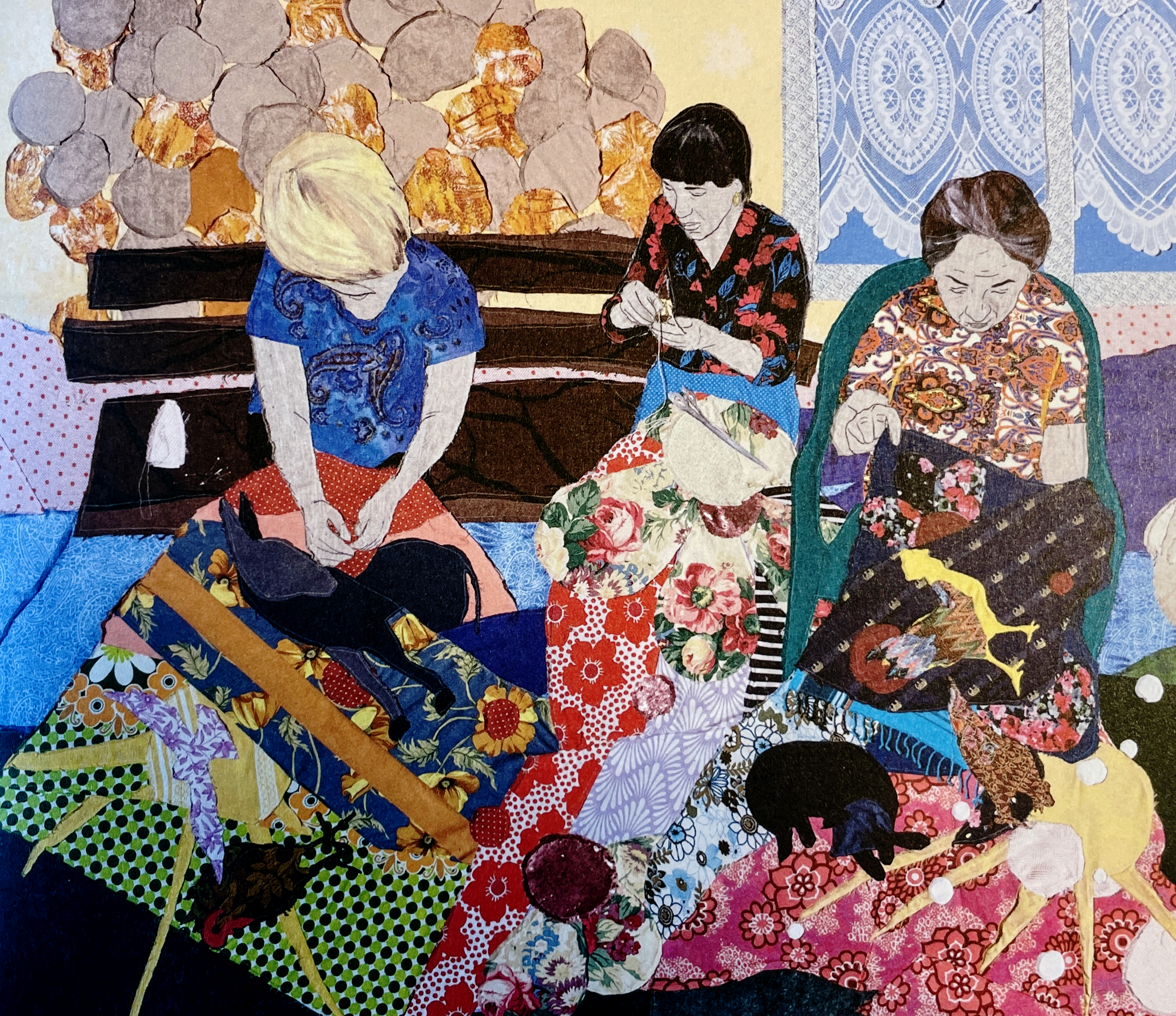
Detail of Re-Enchanting the World (2022) by Małgorzata Mirga-Tas, whose other paintings are in the ING Polish Art Foundation's collection

The ING Polish Art Foundation (Fundacja Sztuki Polskiej ING) was established in 2000 by companies of the ING Bank Śląski capital group, after the Zachęta National Gallery of Art had approached ING for financial support for an exhibition on Dutch culture. The Foundation reflects ING Group's long-standing Dutch corporate tradition of art collecting. The collection of the Foundation includes works created after 1990 by living Polish artists. As of 2023, the collection includes over 250 works by artists including Stefan Gierowski, Edward Dwurnik, Leon Tarasewicz, Jerzy Nowosielski, Wilhelm Sasnal, Aneta Grzeszykowska, and Rafał Milach. By the mid-2020s the collection had grown to more than 300 works. The Foundation acquires them on the primary market or occasionally commissions, and it does not sign artists to exclusive representation agreements nor operates as a commercial gallery. According to its statute, if it ceases operating, the entire collection will be transferred to the Zachęta Gallery.

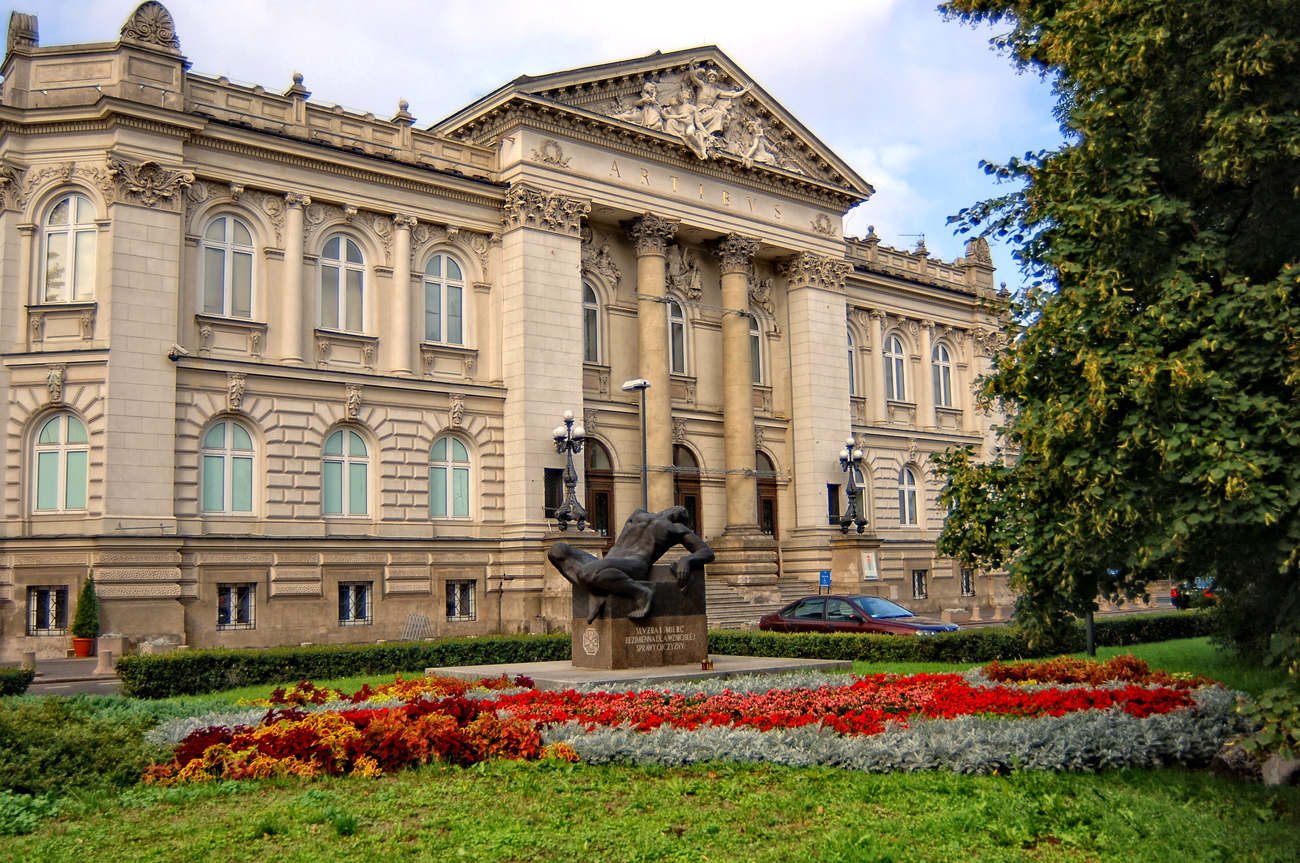
The Zachęta – National Gallery of Art, a contemporary art museum in Warsaw

The foundation's acquires are either routine purchases made by the Zachęta Gallery's management, agreed by the foundation's board, and works recognized through the annual competition Art Foundation Award, held since 2017, selected by an international jury. The award and an exhibition of the collection are presented during the Warsaw Gallery Weekend. Recent recipients of the main prize include Joanna Rajkowska (2024) and Monika Mamzeta (2025). The foundation also awards a smaller special prize to non-commercial, artist-run exhibition spaces.

Works from the collection are displayed in the bank's own office spaces at its Warsaw and Katowice premises. In 2023, the foundation opened a permanent, publicly accessible exhibition space in the Plac Unii complex in Warsaw; the collection is also lent to exhibitions in Poland and abroad. The foundation licenses high-resolution images of the collection under Creative Commons terms. Since 2017 the foundation has run "Artysta – Zawodowiec" (Artist – Professional), an education program for art-school students and graduates covering copyright and contract law, tax and social-insurance obligations, grant writing and project budgeting, and building relationships with galleries and institutions. Art critics praised the program.

=== ING Children's Foundation ===
The bank's other corporate foundation is the ING Children's Foundation (Fundacja ING Dzieciom). The two foundations collaborate on joint projects, including art workshops for children with disabilities and refugee backgrounds.

=== Sponsorships and other initiatives ===
The bank is title sponsor of ING Silesia Beats, a multi-day music festival held at Silesian Park in Chorzów. Its 2025 edition drew over 36,000 attendees. The bank has also sponsored ING Biegnij Warszawo, an annual 10-kilometer mass-participation road running through central Warsaw held each October since 2009.

== Awards and recognition ==
ING Bank Śląski has received several banking-industry awards. In 2019, Global Finance's Best Digital Banks awards named online-banking platform ING Business, then used by more than 65,000 companies, the world's best online system for corporate digital banking. In 2020, it was named Best Mobile Banking App in Central and Eastern Europe by Global Finance, and CEE's "Best Digital Bank" at Euromoney's Awards of Excellence. In 2022, the bank won the "Mobile banking" category at the Mobile Trends Awards for its mobile application.

Between 2016 and 2022, Polish daily Dziennik Gazeta Prawna and PwC ranked ING BSK first in their "Stars of Banking" (Gwiazdy Bankowości) ranking of overall bank performance. ING returned to the top of the ranking in its 2026 edition.

In 2021, business daily Puls Biznesu's survey Listed Company of the Year (Giełdowa Spółka Roku) ranked ING Bank Śląski third overall among Warsaw-listed companies, and third for management-board competence. In April 2026, Bankier.pl's Złoty Bankier awards named ING BSK the winner of its category "Bank with a mission" ("Bank z misją"), recognizing corporate-responsibility performance. In 2025, the same awards ranked the bank first among Polish banks for its use of social media, under a "smart banking" theme.

== See also ==
- List of banks in Poland
