= Inventory theory =

Material theory (or more formally the mathematical theory of inventory and production) is the sub-specialty within operations research and operations management that is concerned with the design of production/inventory systems to minimize costs: it studies the decisions faced by firms and the military in connection with manufacturing, warehousing, supply chains, spare part allocation and so on and provides the mathematical foundation for logistics. The inventory control problem is the problem faced by a firm that must decide how much to order in each time period to meet demand for its products. The problem can be modeled using mathematical techniques of optimal control, dynamic programming and network optimization. The study of such models is part of inventory theory.

== Issues ==
One issue is infrequent large orders vs. frequent small orders. Large orders will increase the amount of inventory on hand, which is costly, but may benefit from volume discounts. Frequent orders are costly to process, and the resulting small inventory levels may increase the probability of stockouts, leading to loss of customers. In principle all these factors can be calculated mathematically and the optimum found.

A second issue is related to changes in demand (predictable or random) for the product. For example, having the needed merchandise on hand in order to make sales during the appropriate buying season(s). A classic example is a toy store before Christmas: if the items are not on the shelves, they cannot be sold. And the wholesale market is not perfect; there can be considerable delays, particularly with the most popular toys. So, the entrepreneur or business manager will buy speculatively. Another example is a furniture store. If there is a six-week, or more, delay for customers to receive merchandise, some sales will be lost. A further example is a restaurant, where a considerable percentage of the sales are the value-added aspects of food preparation and presentation, and so it is rational to buy and store somewhat more to reduce the chances of running out of key ingredients. The situation often comes down to two key questions: confidence in the merchandise selling, and the benefits accruing if it does?

A third issue comes from the view that inventory also serves the function of decoupling two separate operations. For example, work in process inventory often accumulates between two departments because the consuming and the producing department do not coordinate their work. With improved coordination this buffer inventory could be eliminated. This leads to the whole philosophy of Just In Time, which argues that the costs of carrying inventory have typically been underestimated, including both the direct, obvious costs of storage space and insurance, but also the harder-to-measure costs of increased variables and complexity, and thus decreased flexibility, for the business enterprise.

== Inventory models ==
The mathematical approach is typically formulated as follows: a store has, at time $k$, $x_k$ items in stock. It then orders (and receives) $u_k$ items, and sells $w_k$ items, where $w$ follows a given probability distribution. Thus:

$$x_{k+1} = x_k + u_k - w_k$$
$$u_k \ge 0$$

Whether $x_k$ is allowed to go negative, corresponding to back-ordered items, will depend on the specific situation; if allowed there will usually be a penalty for back orders. The store has costs that are related to the number of items in store and the number of items ordered:

$c_k = c(x_k, u_k)$. Often this will be in additive form: $c_k = p(x_k) + h(u_k)$

The store wants to select $u_k$ in an optimal way, i.e. to minimize

$$\sum_{k=0}^T c_k.$$

Many other features can be added to the model, including multiple products (denoted $x_{ik}$), upper bounds on inventory and so on. Inventory models can be based on different assumptions:

- Nature of demand: constant, deterministically time-varying or stochastic
- Costs: variable versus fixed
- Flow of time: discrete versus continuous
- Lead time: deterministic or stochastic
- Time horizon: finite versus infinite (T=+∞)
- Presence or absence of back-ordering
- Production rate: infinite, deterministic or random
- Presence or absence of quantity discounts
- Imperfect quality
- Capacity: infinite or limited
- Products: one or many
- Location: one or many
- Echelons: one or many

=== Classic models ===
Although the number of models described in the literature is immense, the following is a list of classics:

- Infinite fill rate for the part being produced: Economic order quantity model, a.k.a. Wilson EOQ Model
- Constant fill rate for the part being produced: Economic production quantity model
- Orders placed at regular intervals: fixed time period model
- Demand is random, only one replenishment: classical Newsvendor model
- Demand is random, continuous replenishment: Base stock model
- Continuous replenishment with backorders: (Q,r) model
- Demand varies deterministically over time: Dynamic lot size model or Wagner-Whitin model
- Demand varies deterministically over time: Silver–Meal heuristic
- Several products produced on the same machine: Economic lot scheduling problem

== See also ==
- Inventory control
- Strategic inventory
- Safety stock
- Inventory optimization
- Inventory management software
- Supply chain management
- Warehouse management system
