= Joanka =

Joanka may refer to the following places:

- Joanka, Kalisz County in Greater Poland Voivodeship (west-central Poland)
- Joanka, Kępno County in Greater Poland Voivodeship (west-central Poland)
- Joanka, Poznań County in Greater Poland Voivodeship (west-central Poland)
