= Jankowy =

- Village
- Location within Poland
- Coordinates: 51°16′N 18°3′E
- Country: Poland
- Voivodeship: Greater Poland
- County: Kępno
- Gmina: Baranów

Jankowy [janˈkɔvɨ] is a village in the administrative district of Gmina Baranów, within Kępno County, Greater Poland Voivodeship, in west-central Poland.
