= Marian Czakański =

Polish politician and economist

Minister in the Ministry of Health of the Republic of Poland
- In office 11 June 2004 – 15 July 2004
- Preceded by: Jerzy Hausner
- Succeeded by: Marek Balicki

Personal details
- Born: 1 October 1946 (age 79) Siemianowice Śląskie

Marian Czakański (born 1 October 1946 in Siemianowice Śląskie) is a Polish politician and economist. He briefly served as Minister of Health in the government of Marek Belka (2004).

== Education ==
He is a 1969 graduate of the Warsaw School of Economics (SGPiS) attending the Department of Finance and Statistics.

During 1971 and 1972 he was an exchange scholar under a Ford Foundation program, as well a special graduate student at the MIT Sloan School of Management and Harvard University.

In 1975, he defended his Ph.D. dissertation in strategic planning and management under Professor Jerzy Ruszkiewicz at the Warsaw University of Technology (Warsaw Tech). He also worked as an instructor at the Institute of Economics and Social Sciences, a unit of Warsaw Tech.

He was active in a faculty exchange program that was established between Warsaw Tech and the Virginia Polytechnic Institute and State University. Under Professor Carl Bellas, he taught management at the Pamplin School of Business together with Christopher Ziemnowicz.

During 1995 and 1996, he took courses in banking and strategic management at the Harvard Business School as well as at the Irish Development Institute in Dublin.

== Early career ==
From 1970 to 1989 he was Director of the Department of Export Development in the Ministry of Economy International Economic Cooperation.

He also held positions as:

- Advisor to the vice-chairman of the Council of Ministers
- Director of the Office of International Economic Cooperation in the Council of Ministers
- Director of the Office of Science and Technical Progress in the Central Planning Commission

From 1989 to 1992 he was a special advisor to the Polish Embassy in Canada.

From 1992, he worked at Bank Pekao, and from 1995 to 1998 as its vice-president. In August 1998, he became president of the Pension Company Nationale-Nederlanden (ING). In June 2000, he became president of Bank Śląski and resigned in March 2004. He then joined the supervisory board of the Polish petroleum company PKN Orlen.

In 2003, the weekly magazine Przegląd placed Czakański as number 39 in its list of the most influential people in Poland.

== As Minister of Health ==
On 11 June 2004, Czakański was nominated as the Minister of Health. He took over after Wojciech Rudnicki started this position just one-month previously, but Rudnicki's state of health forced him to resign (with a brief period Jerzy Hausner as acting) and thus Czakański substituted him.

Similarly, Czakański did not keep the position for very long. He turned in his resignation in the following month after series of critical statements he made during the course of Sejm debate about the condition of the health service in Poland. The explanation for the sudden resignation was that because he is not politician, he did not see capability of reforming the Polish health care system. Czakański said that his resignation was for "personal reasons", but he underscored that "the situation in this area is such that it revolves mainly around politics, and not about issues that can be resolved. I know how to make the reforms, but I can also see the directions these problems are going." After Czakański's brief service, Senator Marek Balicki took the position of the Minister of Health as of 15 July 2004.

Czakański was just one of many shuffles in the leadership of Poland's Health Ministry that further contributed to the problems of reforming the nation's chronically underfunded health system.

== Later career ==
During 2004–2005, he was an Advisor to the President of ING Bank Śląski. He was appointed to the Board of Directors on 15 September 2005.

He served on the board of directors of several companies and organizations including:

- Member appointed by the Prime Minister to the State Committee for Scientific Research (KBN) responsible for national policy in the area of science and technology.
- Advisory Board member for CEMBA (Canadian Executive MBA at the Warsaw School of Economics).
- Management board member of the Polish Bank Association (Związek Banków Polskich - ZBP)
- Served on the International Advisory Board for Business and Marketing for MasterCard
