= Baranów, Greater Poland Voivodeship =

Baranów
- Village
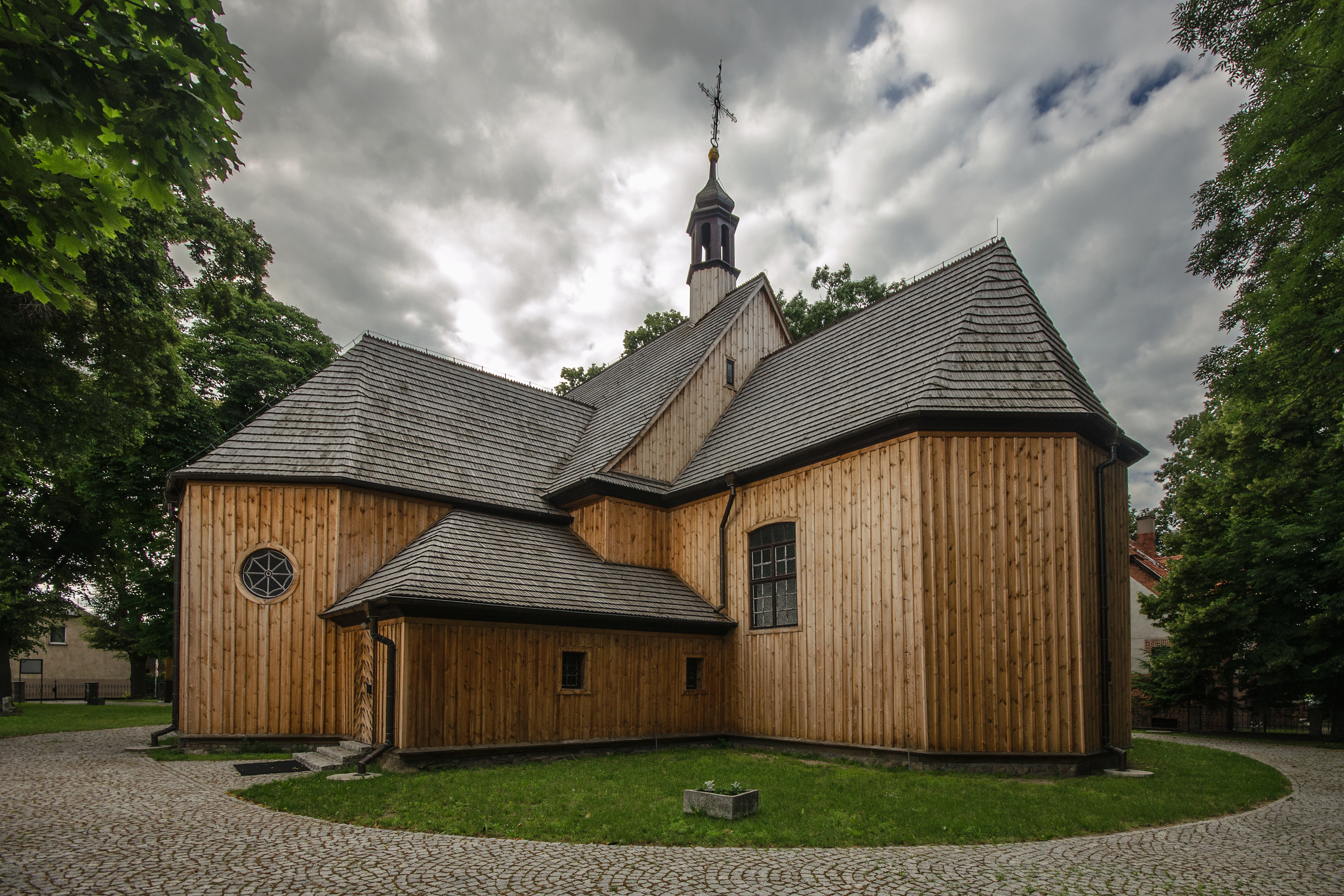
- Saint Lawrence and Saint Andrew church in Baranów

- Location within Poland
- Coordinates: 51°16′1″N 18°0′15″E
- Country: Poland
- Voivodeship: Greater Poland
- County: Kępno
- Gmina: Baranów

Population
  - Total: 1,500
- Time zone: UTC+1 (CET)
  - Summer (DST): UTC+2 (CEST)
- Vehicle registration: PKE

Baranów [baˈranuf] is a village in Kępno County, Greater Poland Voivodeship, in west-central Poland. It is the seat of the gmina (administrative district) called Gmina Baranów.

Baranów was a private town, administratively located in the Ostrzeszów County in the Sieradz Voivodeship in the Greater Poland Province of the Kingdom of Poland.
