= Gmina Baranów, Greater Poland Voivodeship =

Gmina Baranów Baranów Commune
- Gmina
- Flag Coat of arms

- Location within Kępno County
- Coordinates (Baranów): 51°16′1″N 18°0′15″E
- Country: Poland
- Voivodeship: Greater Poland
- County: Kępno
- Seat: Baranów

Area
  - Total: 74.31 km^{2} (28.69 sq mi)

Population (2006)
  - Total: 7,495
  - Density: 100.9/km^{2} (261.2/sq mi)
- Website: http://baranow.pl

Gmina Baranów is a rural gmina (administrative district) in Kępno County, Greater Poland Voivodeship, in west-central Poland. Its seat is the village of Baranów, which lies approximately 3 kilometres (2 mi) south-east of Kępno and 147 km (91 mi) south-east of the regional capital Poznań.

The gmina covers an area of 74.31 square kilometres (28.7 sq mi), and as of 2006 its total population is 7,495.

== Villages ==
Gmina Baranów contains the villages and settlements of Baranów, Baranów Osiedle Murator, Donaborów, Grębanin, Jankowy, Joanka, Łęka Mroczeńska, Marianka Mroczeńska, Mroczeń, Słupia pod Kępnem, and Żurawiniec.

== Neighbouring gminas ==
Gmina Baranów is bordered by the gminas of Bralin, Kępno, Łęka Opatowska, Rychtal, Trzcinica, and Wieruszów.
