= Żurawiniec, Greater Poland Voivodeship =

Żurawiniec
- Village
- Location within Poland
- Coordinates: 51°13′50″N 17°55′32″E
- Country: Poland
- Voivodeship: Greater Poland
- County: Kępno
- Gmina: Baranów

Żurawiniec [ʐuraˈviɲɛt͡s] is a village in the administrative district of Gmina Baranów, within Kępno County, Greater Poland Voivodeship, in west-central Poland.
