= Thomson M. Whitin =

Thomson McLintock Whitin
- Born: January 12, 1923; Northbridge, Massachusetts, U.S.
- Died: December 9, 2013 (aged 90); Tiverton, Rhode Island, U.S.
- Known for: Dynamic lot-size model

Thomson McLintock Whitin (January 12, 1923 – December 9, 2013) was an American management scientist, and Emeritus Professor of Economics and Social Sciences at Wesleyan University, known for his work on inventory control and inventory management.

== Biography ==
Born and raised in Northbridge, Massachusetts, Whitin graduated from Kent School in Kent, Connecticut, in 1940 and received his AB from Princeton University in 1943. He then joined the U.S. Navy, where he became gunnery officer on the Essex-class aircraft carrier USS Bon Homme Richard (CV-31). After the war he returned to Princeton, where he received his AM and PhD late 1940s.

After graduation Whitin started his academic career as associate professor at Princeton University in its Economics Department. In 1953 he moved to the Massachusetts Institute of Technology, where he was appointed professor of economics in the School of Industrial Management. From 1956 to 1958 he was chief economist at the Atomic Energy Commission in Washington, D.C., and returned to MIT for another two years. In 1960 he was appointed professor of business administration at the University of California at Berkeley. In 1963 he moved back to Connecticut to the Wesleyan University, where he was appointed Chester D. Hubbard Professor of Economics and Social Sciences, where he stayed until his retirement June 30, 1993.

In 1958 Whitin and Harvey M. Wagner wrote the article "Dynamic version of the economic lot size model.", which would become the seminal work on the dynamic lot-size model.

Whitin died aged 90 in Tiverton, Rhode Island, in December 2013.

== Publications ==
Books:

- 1953. The Theory of Inventory Management. (1957, 1970) Princeton University Press
- 1954. Inventory Control Research: A Survey
- 1957. Dynamic Problems in the Theory of the Firm. With Harvey M. Wagner. Rand Corp Santa Monica Calif.
- 1963. Analysis of Inventory Systems. With G. Hadley. Englewood Cliffs: Prentice-Hall
- 1967. Inventory Control and Price Theory.

Articles, a selection:

- 1952. "Inventory control in theory and practice." Quarterly Journal of Economics, Nov 1952.
- 1953. "Classical theory, Graham's theory, and linear programming in international trade." The Quarterly Journal of Economics 67.4. p. 520-544.
- 1958. "Dynamic version of the economic lot size model." With H.M. Wagner in: Management Science, Vol. 5, pp. 89–96, 1958
- 1961. "A family of inventory models" with G. Hadley, Management Science
