= Harvey M. Wagner =

American economist

Harvey Maurice Wagner (November 20, 1931 – July 23, 2017) was an American management scientist, consultant, and Professor of Operations Research and Innovation Management at the University of North Carolina, Chapel Hill, known for his books on Operations Research and his seminal work on the dynamic lot-size model with Thomson M. Whitin.

== Biography ==
Wagner was born and raised in San Francisco and moved to Los Angeles in 1941. He received his BS in 1953 and his MS in 1954 from Stanford University, and his Ph.D. from Massachusetts Institute of Technology in 1960. In 1964 he was elected as a Fellow of the American Statistical Association. In the 1980s he received an Honorary degree from the Katholieke Universiteit Leuven in Belgium. He was also a Marshall Scholar.

In 1954 Wagner started his academic career at Stanford University, where from 1957 to 1967 he was Professor at the Graduate School of Business. From 1967 to 1976 he was Professor at Yale University, and from 1976 to his death was Professor of Operations, Technology and Innovation Management at the University of North Carolina, Chapel Hill. Among his early doctoral students was Yvo Dirickx, now a senior professor. Since the 1960s Wagner had also served as a consultant with McKinsey & Company.

In 1969 Wagner was awarded the Frederick W. Lanchester Prize for his 1969 book Principles of Operations Research. For the year 1973-1974 he was elected president of TIMS. In 1984 he received the Edelman Award, and in 1996 the INFORMS Expository Writing Award. In 2002 he was named as a Fellow of INFORMS.

== Work ==
Wagner's research interests were in the fields of operations management, production planning and supply-chain management.

== Publications ==
Wagner has published five books and about 60 articles on operations research topics. Books:

- 1957. Dynamic Problems in the Theory of the Firm. With T.M. Whitin. Rand Corp Santa Monica Calif.
- 1958. Linear Programming Techniques for Regression Analysis
- 1960. A postscript to “Dynamic problems in the theory of the firm”. Harvey M. Wagner. Stanford University.
- 1962. Statistical management of inventory systems. New York, Wiley.
- 1969. Principles of operations research, with applications to managerial decisions. Prentice-Hall
