= Base stock model =

The base stock model is a statistical model in inventory theory. In this model inventory is refilled one unit at a time and demand is random. If there is only one replenishment, then the problem can be solved with the newsvendor model.

== Overview ==
=== Assumptions ===
1. Products can be analyzed individually
2. Demands occur one at a time (no batch orders)
3. Unfilled demand is back-ordered (no lost sales)
4. Replenishment lead times are fixed and known
5. Replenishments are ordered one at a time
6. Demand is modeled by a continuous probability distribution

=== Variables ===
- $L$ = Replenishment lead time
- $X$ = Demand during replenishment lead time
- $g(x)$ = probability density function of demand during lead time
- $G(x)$ = cumulative distribution function of demand during lead time
- $\theta$ = mean demand during lead time
- $h$ = cost to carry one unit of inventory for 1 year
- $b$ = cost to carry one unit of back-order for 1 year
- $r$ = reorder point
- $SS=r-\theta$, safety stock level
- $S(r)$ = fill rate
- $B(r)$ = average number of outstanding back-orders
- $I(r)$ = average on-hand inventory level

== Fill rate, back-order level and inventory level ==
In a base-stock system inventory position is given by on-hand inventory-backorders+orders and since inventory never goes negative, inventory position=r+1. Once an order is placed the base stock level is r+1 and if X≤r+1 there won't be a backorder. The probability that an order does not result in back-order is therefore:

$P(X\leq r+1)=G(r+1)$

Since this holds for all orders, the fill rate is:

$S(r)=G(r+1)$

If demand is normally distributed $\mathcal{N}(\theta,\,\sigma^2)$, the fill rate is given by:

$S(r)=\phi\left( \frac{r+1-\theta}{\sigma} \right)$

Where $\phi()$ is cumulative distribution function for the standard normal. At any point in time, there are orders placed that are equal to the demand X that has occurred, therefore on-hand inventory-backorders=inventory position-orders=r+1-X. In expectation this means:

$I(r)=r+1-\theta+B(r)$

In general the number of outstanding orders is X=x and the number of back-orders is:

$$Backorders=\begin{cases} 0, & x < r+1 \\ x-r-1, & x \ge r+1 \end{cases}$$

The expected back order level is therefore given by:

$B(r)=\int_{r}^{+\infty }\left( x-r-1 \right)g(x)dx=\int_{r+1}^{+\infty }\left( x-r \right)g(x)dx$

Again, if demand is normally distributed:

$B(r)=(\theta-r)[1-\phi(z)]+\sigma\phi(z)$

Where $z$ is the inverse distribution function of a standard normal distribution.

== Total cost function and optimal reorder point ==
The total cost is given by the sum of holdings costs and backorders costs:

$TC=hI(r)+bB(r)$

It can be proven that:

$G(r^{*}+1)=\frac{b}{b+h}$

Where r* is the optimal reorder point.

Proof

$\frac{dTC}{dr}=h+(b+h)\frac{dB}{dr}$

$\frac{dB}{dr}=\frac{d}{dr} \int_{r+1}^{+\infty} (x-r-1) g(x) dx = - \int_{r+1}^{+\infty} g(x) dx = -[1 - G(r+1)]$

To minimize TC set the first derivative equal to zero:

$\frac{dTC}{dr} = h - (b+h) [1-G(r+1)]=0$

And solve for G(r+1).

If demand is normal then r* can be obtained by:

$r^{*}+1=\theta+z\sigma$

== See also ==
- Infinite fill rate for the part being produced: Economic order quantity
- Constant fill rate for the part being produced: Economic production quantity
- Demand is random: classical Newsvendor model
- Continuous replenishment with backorders: (Q,r) model
- Demand varies deterministically over time: Dynamic lot size model
- Several products produced on the same machine: Economic lot scheduling problem
