= Słupia pod Kępnem =

Słupia
- Village
- Location within Poland
- Coordinates: 51°14′19″N 18°02′32″E
- Country: Poland
- Voivodeship: Greater Poland
- County: Kępno
- Gmina: Baranów

Population
  - Total: 1,500

Słupia [ˈswupja ˈpɔt ˈkɛmpnɛm] is a village in the administrative district of Gmina Baranów, within Kępno County, Greater Poland Voivodeship, in west-central Poland.
