= Mroczeń =

- Village
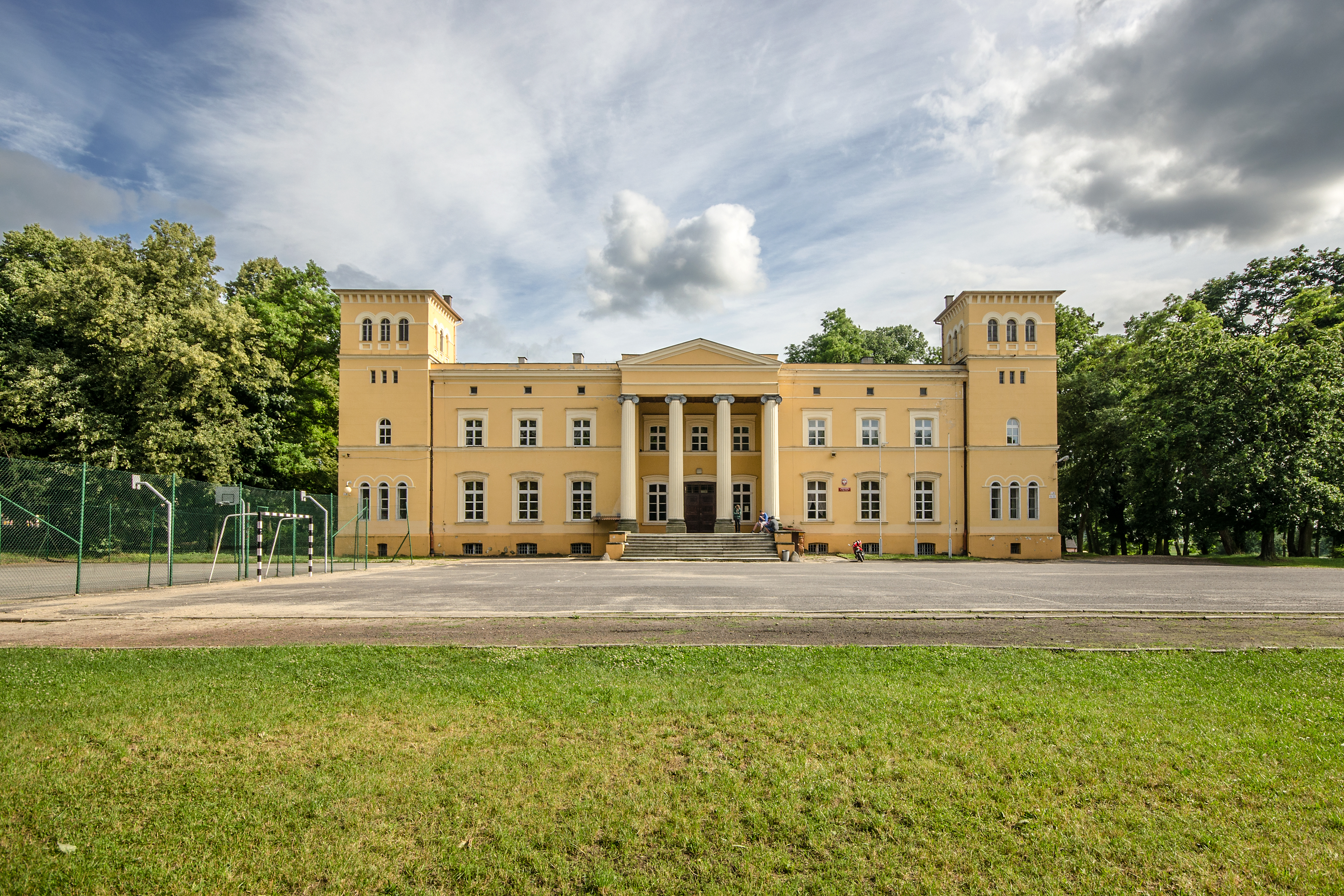
- Wężyk Palace in Mroczeń

- Location within Poland
- Coordinates: 51°13′N 17°58′E
- Country: Poland
- Voivodeship: Greater Poland
- County: Kępno
- Gmina: Baranów

Population
  - Total: 1,500
- Time zone: UTC+1 (CET)
  - Summer (DST): UTC+2 (CEST)
- Vehicle registration: PKE

Mroczeń [ˈmrɔt͡ʂɛɲ] is a village in the administrative district of Gmina Baranów, within Kępno County, Greater Poland Voivodeship, in west-central Poland.

== History ==
Following the joint German-Soviet invasion of Poland, which started World War II in September 1939, it was occupied by Nazi Germany until 1945. In 1939 and 1941, the Germans carried out expulsions of Poles, whose farms were then handed over to German colonists as part of the Lebensraum policy. Expelled Poles were deported either to Mińsk Mazowiecki or Kraków District in the more-eastern part of German-occupied Poland, or to forced labour in Germany.
