= Grębanin =

- Village
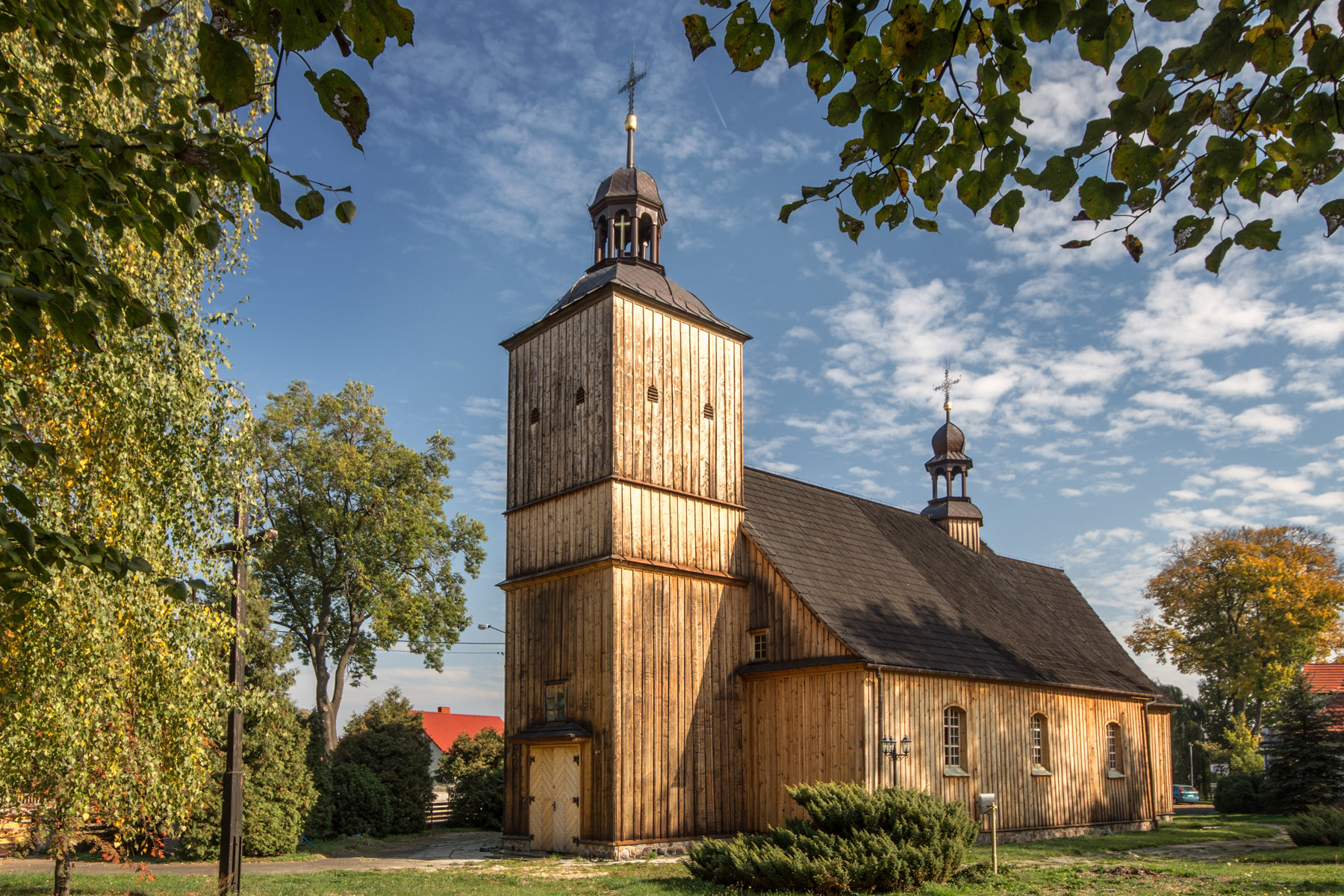
- Church of the Immaculate Conception of the Virgin Mary

- Location within Poland
- Coordinates: 51°14′N 17°58′E
- Country: Poland
- Voivodeship: Greater Poland
- County: Kępno
- Gmina: Baranów

Grębanin [ɡrɛmˈbanin] is a village in the administrative district of Gmina Baranów, within Kępno County, Greater Poland Voivodeship, in west-central Poland.
