= Joanka, Kępno County =

Joanka
- Village
- Location within Poland
- Coordinates: 51°14′N 18°1′E
- Country: Poland
- Voivodeship: Greater Poland
- County: Kępno
- Gmina: Baranów

Population
  - Total: 275

Joanka [jɔˈanka] is a village in the administrative district of Gmina Baranów, within Kępno County, Greater Poland Voivodeship, in west-central Poland.
