= Strategic inventory =

Topic in inventory management

Strategic inventory is a collection of stored goods where the primary rationale is rooted in the strategic interaction among involved parties within a supply chain. Different from other motives for inventory management, such as fixed costs (e.g. cyclic inventory in the economic order quantity model), uncertainties in demand and supply (safety stock), and fluctuations in prices (speculative stock), strategic inventories emerge as a distinctive category.

Inventory theory indicates that maintaining inventories beyond immediate demand can yield advantages by curbing the bargaining power of suppliers. This strategic action influences the supplier to impose higher prices during initial periods, capitalizing on the heightened demand resulting from building strategic inventories. Subsequently, the supplier competes against these strategic inventories in later periods. Dynamic prices may be a consequence of strategic stock management.

Examples of industries known for extensive reliance on strategic inventories include those involved in fossil fuels and semiconductors.
