= Donaborów =

- Village
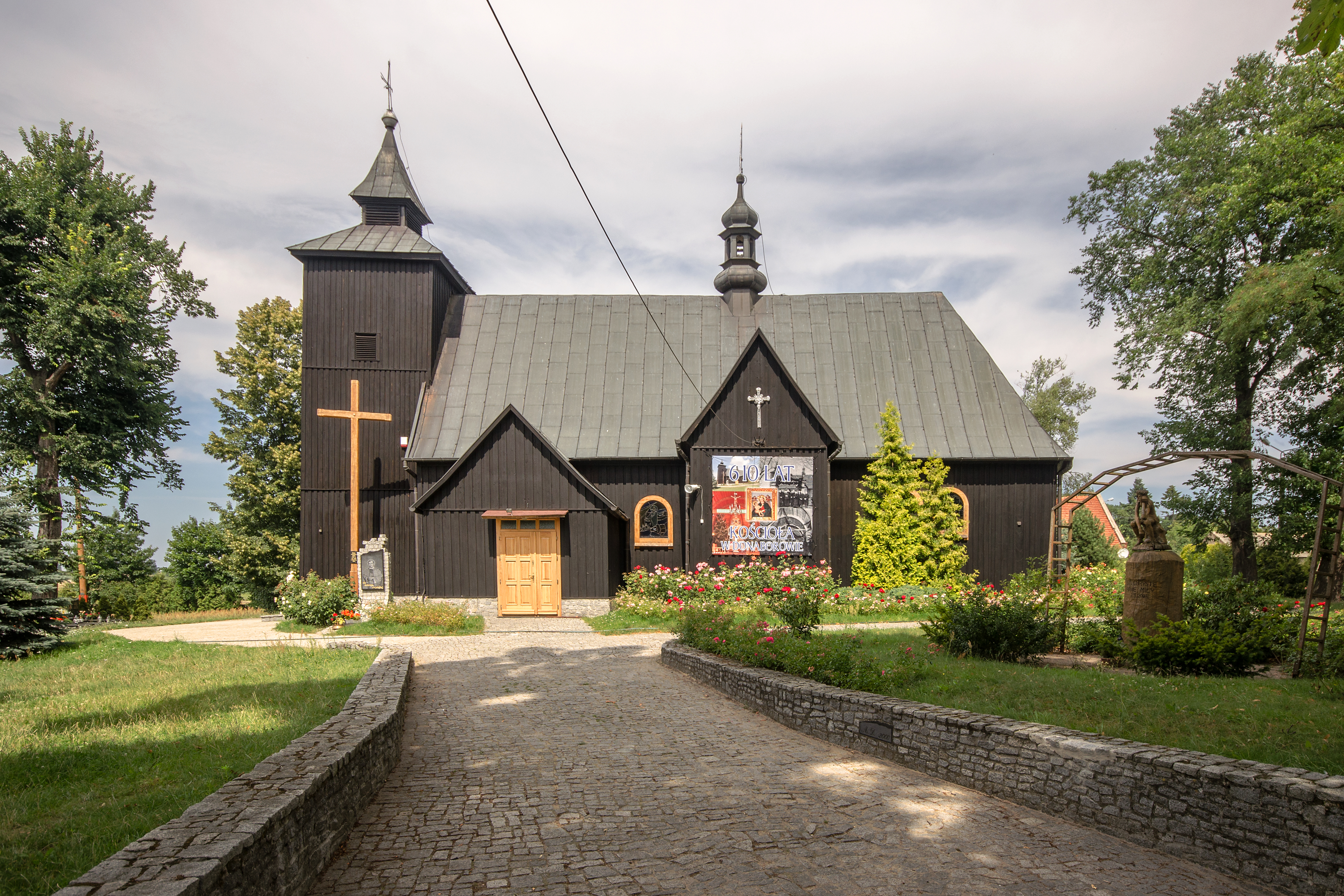
- Church of Saint Martin

- Location within Poland
- Coordinates: 51°16′N 18°5′E
- Country: Poland
- Voivodeship: Greater Poland
- County: Kępno
- Gmina: Baranów

Population (approx.)
  - Total: 500

Donaborów [dɔnaˈbɔruf] is a village in the administrative district of Gmina Baranów, within Kępno County, Greater Poland Voivodeship, in west-central Poland.

The village has an approximate population of 501.
