= Miles (surname) =

Miles is a surname. Notable people with the surname include:

== Television and film ==
- Miles Brothers, American early cinema pioneers
- A. D. Miles, actor who is best known as Marty Shonson in Dog Bites Man
- Annie Miles, actress
- Aubrey Miles, Filipino actress and singer
- Ben Miles, British actor best known for his role as Patrick Maitland on the television situation comedy Coupling
- Bernard Miles, English character actor, writer and director
- Charlie Creed-Miles, English actor
- Elaine Miles, Cayuse/Nez Perce actress best known for her role as Marilyn Whirlwind in the television series Northern Exposure
- Joanna Miles (born 1940), American actress
- Kevin Miles, Australian actor
- Kevin Miles, American actor
- Michael Miles, TV presenter in Britain
- Nick Miles, English actor well known for his part in ITV's Emmerdale as businessman Jimmy King
- Peter Miles (American actor) (1938–2002), American actor
- Peter Miles (English actor) (1928–2018), British actor
- Sarah Miles, English theater and film actress
- Stuart Miles, British comedian and television presenter
- Sylvia Miles (1924–2019), American actress
- Vera Miles, American actress

== Sports ==
- Aaron Miles, retired Major League Baseball player
- Aaron Miles (basketball), retired professional basketball player and current college basketball assistant coach
- Barron Miles, defensive back for the British Columbia Lions in the Canadian Football League
- Brent Miles, president of the Tri-City Dust Devils
- C. J. Miles, American professional basketball player
- Charlie Miles (born 2001), Jersey cricketer
- Darius Miles, American basketball player for the NBA's Portland Trail Blazers
- Duke Miles (born 2002), American basketball player
- Eddie Miles, American football player
- Ellie Miles (born 1999), English rugby union player
- Eustace Miles, British Real Tennis player and author
- Gene Miles, Australian rugby league footballer
- Graham Miles, retired English snooker player
- Harold Miles, English cricketer
- Ian Miles (1952–2025), Australian rules footballer
- Isaiah Miles (born 1994), American basketball player in the Israeli Basketball Premier League
- John Miles (footballer), English footballer
- John Miles (racing driver), former Formula One driver from England
- Jonathan Miles (cricketer), English cricketer
- Joshua Miles (American football) (born 1996), American football player
- Ken Miles, British sports car driver
- Les Miles, former head coach of the LSU football team
- Linda Miles, American World Wrestling Entertainment alumnus
- Marshall Miles (1926–2013), American bridge player
- Olivia Miles (born 2003), American basketball player
- Ostell Miles (born 1970), American football player
- Robert Miles (cricketer) (1846–1930), English cricketer
- Sally Miles, American college sports coach
- Spencer Miles (born 2000), American baseball player
- Stanley Miles, English cyclist
- Tim Miles, American current head coach of the Nebraska men's basketball team
- Tony Miles (Canadian football), Canadian Football League wide receiver/punt returner for the Toronto Argonauts
- Trent Miles, current head coach of the Georgia State football team

== Literature ==
- Barry Miles, author who has written biographies of Paul McCartney, William Burroughs, Frank Zappa, and Allen Ginsberg as well as books about John Lennon and the Beatles
- Dorothy Miles, sign language poet and playwright who worked in the U.K. and U.S.
- George Henry Miles, dramatist and man of letters
- Hallie Eustace Miles (1855–1947), writer, restaurateur, and activist
- Jack Miles, author whose work has appeared in numerous national publications
- Josephine Miles, poet and literature critic
- Lawrence Miles, science-fiction author best known for his work on original Doctor Who novels
- Lawrence Delos Miles, the author of Value Engineering
- Rosalind Miles (author), English author
- Susan Miles, British poet

== Music ==
- Buddy Miles (1947–2008), American drummer, member of Jimi Hendrix's Band of Gypsys
- Butch Miles (1944–2023), American drummer and musician
- C. Austin Miles (Charles Austin Miles, 1868–1946), American writer of gospel songs
- Floyd Miles (1943–2018), American musician
- Jane Mary Miles, married name of Jane Mary Guest (c. 1762–1846), English composer and pianist
- John Miles (1949–2021), English vocalist, guitarist and keyboard player best known for his 1976 Top 3 hit Music
- Lizzie Miles, African American singer
- Luke "Long Gone" Miles (1925–1987), American Texas blues and electric blues singer and songwriter
- Lynn Miles, Ottawa-based singer-songwriter
- Paul Miles-Kingston, British singer who achieved fame as a boy soprano classical singer
- Philip Napier Miles, English composer, philanthropist and landowner
- Robert Miles (1969–2017), stage name of Swiss-born Italian DJ and musician Roberto Concina

== Military ==
- Dixon S. Miles, career U.S. Army officer who served in the Mexican–American War and the Indian Wars; mortally wounded in Civil War
- Francis George Miles, English recipient of the Victoria Cross
- Admiral Sir Geoffrey John Audley Miles, English naval commander in both World Wars, last Commander in Chief of pre-independence Royal Indian Navy
- Louis Wardlaw Miles, World War I Medal of Honor recipient
- Nelson A. Miles, American soldier who served in the American Civil War, Indian Wars, and the Spanish–American War
- Samuel Miles, revolutionary American and Philadelphia public servant
- Sherman Miles (1882–1966), son of Nelson A. Miles. U.S. Army officer during World War I and II; head of M.I.D. at the time of the attack on Pearl Harbor.

== Business ==
- Kevin Miles (CEO), chief executive officer of Zoës Kitchen
- Michael A. Miles, special limited partner of Forstmann Little & Company

== Politics ==
- Alonzo L. Miles (1864–1917), American politician and lawyer
- Cindy Miles, Canadian politician
- Hooper S. Miles (1895–1964), American politician and lawyer
- Jack Miles (political activist), Australian left-wing activist
- John Miles (Australian politician), Australian politician and member of the Victorian Legislative Council for Templestowe Province
- John E. Miles, politician from New Mexico who served as Governor
- Julie Miles, politician from New Hampshire
- M. W. Miles, American politician
- Peter Hubbard-Miles, British Conservative Party politician
- Philip John Miles, English politician, landowner, financier, father of John William Miles, Sir William Miles, 1st Baronet and Philip William Skinner Miles and grandfather of Sir Philip Miles, 2nd Baronet, Philip Napier Miles and Frank Miles, great-grandfather of Admiral Sir Geoffrey John Audley Miles.
- Sir Philip Miles, 2nd Baronet, English politician and landowner
- Philip Miles (British Army officer) (1864–1948)
- Robert E. Miles, a White supremacist leader from Michigan
- Rufus Miles (1910–1996), American government administrator
- Steen Miles (1946–2017), American politician
- William Porcher Miles, Representative from South Carolina born in Charleston on July 4, 1822
- Sir William Miles, 1st Baronet, English politician and landowner

== Other ==
- Rev'd Canon Charles Oswald Miles (1850–1898), Anglican Clergyman and brother of Frank Miles
- David Miles, British economist
- David Miles (radio), British continuity announcer and newsreader on BBC Radio 4
- Desmond Miles, main protagonist in the Assassin's Creed franchise's modern storyline (2007–2012)
- Frank Miles, London artist who specialised in pastel portraits of society ladies
- Frederick George Miles, British aircraft designer and constructor
- George Miles (Michigan jurist) (1789–1850), associate justice of the Michigan Supreme Court
- Grosvenor Miles (1901–1978), Anglican bishop in Madagascar and Australia
- Jeffrey Miles (1935–2019), chief justice of the Australian Capital Territory
- Manly Miles (1826–1898), American zoologist and agriculturalist
- Mike Miles (disambiguation), multiple people
- Tony Miles, English chess player
- Valerie Miles (artist), British artist
- Vicki Miles-LaGrange, U.S. District Judge in the Western district of Oklahoma
- Willard W. Miles (1845–1926), associate justice of the Vermont Supreme Court

== Fictional characters ==
- Sally Miles, a character in the 1981 American satirical black comedy movie S.O.B.
- George Miles, the protagonist of Dennis Cooper's George Miles Cycle

== See also ==
- Miles (disambiguation)
- Miln
- Milne (disambiguation)
- Milnes (disambiguation)
- Myles (given name)
- Myles (surname)
