= Mylne =

Mylne is a Scottish surname. Notable people with the surname include:

- Alan Mylne (1886–1944), Archdeacon of Matabeleland from 1928 until 1936
- Alfred Mylne (1871–1951), Scottish yacht designer
- Graham Mylne (1834–1876), Australian politician
- James Mylne (disambiguation), multiple people
- John Mylne (disambiguation), multiple people
- Louis George Mylne (1843–1921), Anglican Bishop of Bombay from 1876 to 1897
- Margaret Mylne (1806–1892), Scottish suffragette and writer
- Robert Mylne (disambiguation), multiple people
- Walter Myln (d. 1558), Scottish Protestant martyr
- William Mylne (1734–1790), Scottish architect and engineer
- William Chadwell Mylne (1781–1863), British engineer and architect

== See also ==
- Milne (surname)
- Miles (disambiguation)
- Milnes (disambiguation)
- Myles (given name)
- Myles (surname)
