= Milnes =

Milnes is a surname of British and Scottish origin, a variant of the surname Mills.

Notable people with the surname include:

- Alf Milnes (1893–?), English rugby league footballer
- Alfred Milnes (1844–1916), American politician from Michigan
- Arthur Milnes Marshall, British zoologist
- Brian Milnes (born 1932), Australian rules footballer
- Charlie Milnes (1885–?), English footballer
- Charles Milnes Gaskell (1842–1919), English lawyer and politician
- David Milnes (born 1956), American conductor and instrumentalist
- Eric Milnes (born 1959), American harpsichordist, organist and conductor
- Esther Milnes Day, British author and philanthropist
- Florence Milnes (1893–1966), British librarian
- Fred Milnes (1878–1946), English footballer
- Gladys Turquet-Milnes (1887–1977), British academic and author
- Glenn Milnes (born 1974), New Zealand cricketer
- James Milnes (1755–1805), British politician
- James Milnes Gaskell (1810–1873), British conservative politician
- Leslie Milnes (1922–2013), New Zealand cricketer
- Margaret Crewe-Milnes, Marchioness of Crewe (1881–1967), British heiress and socialite
- Matt Milnes (born 1994), English cricketer
- Nicolette Milnes-Walker (born 1943), English single-handed sailor
- Nora Milnes (1882–1972), British economist, social worker, educator and author
- Richard Milnes (disambiguation), several people
- Robert Milnes (disambiguation), several people
- Rodney Milnes (1936–2015), English opera critic and musicologist
- Rowan Milnes (born 1999), English rugby league footballer
- Sherrill Milnes (born 1935), American baritone
- Sidney Herbert Milnes (c. 1880–1915), English rugby union footballer
- Tom Milnes (born 1992), English cricketer
- Thomas Milnes (1870–1954), Canadian politician from Alberta
- Thomas Milnes (sculptor) (c.1810–1888), English sculptor
- William Milnes Jr. (1827–1889), American politician and industrialist
- William Milnes Marsden, British solicitor and philatelist

== See also ==
- Milnes Levick (1825–1897), English/American actor, son of Eleanor Milnes
- Mills (surname)
- Miln
- Milne (surname)
- Milner (surname)
- Mylne
