= Myles (given name) =

Myles is a masculine given name, a variant spelling of Miles.

== Notable people with the name include ==
=== A ===
- Myles Abraham (1887–1966), Irish rugby union footballer
- Myles Adams (born 1998), American football player
- Myles Allen, English scientist
- Myles Ambrose (1926–2014), American lawyer
- Myles Amine (born 1996), Sammarinese-American wrestler
- Myles Anderson (born 1990), English footballer
- Myles Arkell (born 1932), English cricketer

=== B ===
- Myles Bailey (born 2005), American baseball player
- Myles Baldwin (born 1978), Australian landscape designer
- Myles Beerman (born 1999), Maltese footballer
- Myles Boddington (1924–2002), English cricketer
- Myles Boisen (born 1956), American guitarist
- Myles Borne (born 1999), American professional wrestler
- Myles Boney (born 1998), English footballer
- Myles Brand (1942–2009), American academic administrator
- Myles Breen, Irish actor
- Myles Brennan (born 1999), American football player
- Myles Brooks (born 2001), American football player
- Myles Brown (born 1992), South African swimmer
- Myles A. Brown, American oncologist
- Myles Brundidge (born 1960), American curler
- Myles Bryant (born 1998), American football player
- Myles Burnyeat (1939–2019), English philosopher
- Myles Byrne (1780–1862), Irish rebel leader

=== C ===
- Myles Cale (born 1999), American basketball player
- Myles Chefetz (born 1958), American restaurateur
- Myles Cole (born 2000), American football player
- Myles Connolly (1897–1964), American author
- Myles Conte (1947–2014), South African cricketer
- Myles Cooper (1735–1785), English priest
- Myles Cornwall (born 1988), Canadian soccer player
- Myles Coverdale (1488–1569), English translator

=== D ===
- Myles Davies (1662–1715/1716), Welsh author
- Myles Deering (born 1953), American general
- Myles de Vries (born 1940), English cricketer
- Myles Dillon (1900–1972), Irish historian
- Myles Dorn (born 1998), American football player
- Myles Dorrian (born 1982), Australian rugby union player
- Myles Dungan (born 1954), Irish broadcaster
- Myles P. Dyer (1887–1969), American politician

=== E ===
- Myles Eason (1915–1977), Australian actor
- Myles Edwards (born 1997), English rugby union footballer
- Myles England, American politician
- Myles Erlick (born 1998), Canadian actor
- Myles D. Evans (1901–1982), American football player and coach

=== F ===
- Myles Fee (born 1981), Canadian ice hockey coach
- Myles Fenton (1830–1918), British railway executive
- Myles Ferguson (1981–2000), Canadian actor
- Myles Ferricks (1875–1932), Australian politician
- Myles Birket Foster (1825–1899), English illustrator
- Myles Frechette (1936–2017), American ambassador
- Myles Frost (born 1999), American actor
- Myles Fukunaga (1909–1929), Japanese-American criminal

=== G ===
- Myles Gal (born 2000), Greek rugby league footballer
- Myles Garrett (born 1995), American football player
- Myles Gaskin (born 1997), American football player
- Myles Goodwyn (1948–2023), Canadian guitarist
- Myles Graham (born 2006), American football player
- Myles Grier, Nigerian-American actor

=== H ===
- Myles Harden (born 2001), American football player
- Myles Hartsfield (born 1997), American football player
- Myles Hesson (born 1990), British basketball player
- Myles Thoroton Hildyard (1914–2005), English historian
- Myles Hinton (born 2002), American football player
- Myles Hippolyte (born 1994), English footballer
- Myles Hogarth (born 1975), Scottish footballer
- Myles Hollander (1941–2025), American statistician
- Myles Horton (1905–1990), American educator
- Myles Humphreys (1925–1998), Northern Irish politician

=== J ===
- Myles Jack (born 1995), American football player
- Myles Jackman (born 1974/1975), English lawyer
- Myles Jackson (born 1964), American history professor
- Myles Jaye (born 1991), American baseball player
- Myles Johnson (born 1999), American basketball player
- Myles Jones (born 1993), American lacrosse player
- Myles Judd (born 1999), English footballer
- Myles Jury (born 1988), American mixed martial artist

=== K ===
- Myles Kenlock (born 1996), English footballer
- Myles Kennedy (born 1969), American musician
- Myles Kenyon (1886–1960), English cricketer
- Myles Keogh (1840–1876), Irish soldier
- Myles Keogh (Irish politician) (??–1952), Irish politician
- Myles Kovacs, American entrepreneur

=== L ===
- Myles Landick (born 1989), English rugby union player
- Myles Lane (1903–1987), American ice hockey player
- Myles Laroda, Bahamian politician
- Myles Lavan, Scottish historian
- Myles Lee (born 1953), Irish businessman
- Myles Lewis-Skelly (born 2006), English footballer
- Myles Little, American photographer
- Myles Loftin (born 1998), American photographer
- Myles Archibald Lyons (1824–1899), Australian police officer

=== M ===
- Myles Mace (1911–2000), American professor
- Myles Mack (born 1993), American basketball player
- Myles Manalo (born 1999), Canadian football coach
- Myles Martel (born 1943), American communication advisor
- Myles Martin (born 1996), American wrestler
- Myles McDonagh (1905–??), Irish boxer
- Myles McDougall, Canadian politician
- Myles McKeon (1919–2016), Irish-Australian bishop
- Myles McRae (1845–1926), Australian politician
- Myles McSweeney (1814–1881), Irish writer
- Myles Miller, American reporter
- Myles Montgomery (born 2003), American football player
- Myles Morgan (born 2005), Canadian soccer player
- Myles Morin (born 1954), Canadian political figure
- Myles Moylan (1838–1909), American army officer
- Myles Munroe (1954–2014), Bahamian evangelist
- Myles Murphy (disambiguation), multiple people
- Myles Murray (1906–1985), Canadian politician

=== N ===
- Myles Naylor (born 2005), Canadian baseball player

=== O ===
- Myles O'Connor (1967–2026), Canadian ice hockey player
- Myles P. O'Connor, American football player
- Myles O'Donnell (??–1933), Irish-American bootlegger
- Myles O'Reilly (disambiguation), multiple people

=== P ===
- Myles Patrick (born 1954), American basketball player
- Myles Peart-Harris (born 2002), English footballer
- Myles Pillage (born 1998), British pentathlete
- Myles Poholke (born 1998), Australian rules footballer
- Myles Pollard (born 1972), Australian actor
- Myles Ponsonby (1924–1999), British soldier
- Myles Porter (born 1985), American judoka
- Myles Powell (born 1997), American basketball player
- Myles Price (born 2001), American football player
- Myles Pritchard (born 1958), Bahamian sailor
- Myles Purchase (born 2002), American football player

=== R ===
- Myles Rice (born 2002), American basketball player
- Myles Roberts (born 2001), English footballer
- Myles Rockwell (born 1972), American mountain biker
- Myles Rowe (born 2000), American racing driver
- Myles Rowser (born 2004), American football player
- Myles Rudge (1926–2007), English songwriter
- Myles Russ (born 1989), American football coach

=== S ===
- Myles Sansted, American football player
- Myles W. Scoggins, American academic administrator
- Myles Shevlin (??–1990), Irish politician
- Myles Smith, (born 1999), English singer
- Myles Standish (1584–1656), English military officer
- Myles Staunton (1935–2011), Irish politician and businessman
- Myles Stephens (born 1997), American basketball player
- Myles Stoddard (born 1977), American soccer player

=== T ===
- Myles Thomas (1897–1963), American baseball player
- Myles Tierney (1937–2017), American mathematician
- Myles Truitt (born 2002), American actor
- Myles Turner (born 1996), American basketball player
- Myles Turner (park warden) (1921–1984), Tanzanian park warden
- Myles Trombley (Nobody) (1993-current), first BCI victim

=== W ===
- Myles Wakefield (born 1974), South African tennis player
- Myles Weston (born 1988), Antiguan footballer
- Myles White (born 1990), American football player
- Myles Wilder (1933–2010), American television producer
- Myles Wright (born 1996), English footballer

== Fictional characters ==
- Myles Crawford, a character from the 1904 novel Ulysses
- Myles MacKenzie, a character from the Metroid series
- Myles McCoy, the father of Josie McCoy in the 2017 television series Riverdale.

== See also ==
- Myles (surname), a page for people with the surname "Myles"
- Miles (given name)
