= Myles (surname) =

Myles is a Germanic and English surname meaning perhaps "peaceful".

== Notable people with the surname ==
- Alannah Myles (born 1958), Canadian singer-songwriter
- Andrew Watson Myles (1884–1970), Canadian politician
- Anthony Myles (disambiguation), multiple people
- Bill Myles (1936–2020), American athletics administrator
- Billy Myles (1924–2005), American songwriter
- Bruce Myles (born 1940), Australian actor
- Charles Myles (1837–1903), Australian politician
- Cree Myles, American influencer
- David Myles (disambiguation), multiple people
- Delvin Myles (born 1972), American football player
- DeShone Myles (born 1974), American football player
- Dion Myles (born 1976), Australian rules footballer
- Edgar Myles (1894–1977), British soldier
- Edward Albert Myles (1865–1951), English priest
- Eileen Myles (born 1949), American poet
- Elliot Myles (born 2007), English footballer
- Emma Myles (born 1987), American actress
- Eve Myles (born 1978), Welsh actress
- Heather Myles (born 1962), American singer
- Henry Myles (disambiguation), multiple people
- Gareth Myles, British academic economist
- Gilbert Myles (born 1945), New Zealand politician
- Godfrey Myles (1968–2011), American football player
- James Myles (1877–1956), British Army officer
- Jesse Myles (1960–2010), American football player
- Jonathan Myles (born 1982), American luger
- Kristyna Myles (born 1984), British singer-songwriter
- L.C. Myles, American politician
- Lamar Myles (born 1986), American football player
- Lynda Myles (disambiguation), multiple people
- Margaret Myles (1892–1988), Scottish author
- Marianne M. Myles (born 1953), American ambassador
- Meg Myles (1934–2019), American model
- Mercy Myles (born 1992), Ghanaian footballer
- Myrtle Tate Myles (1886–1980), American poet
- Nate Myles (born 1985), Australian rugby league footballer
- Neil Myles (1925–1993), Scottish footballer
- Noel Myles (born 1947), English artist
- Patrick Myles (born 1979), English
- Reggie Myles (born 1979), American football player
- Reggie Myles (athlete) (1924–1997), Irish sprinter
- Simon Myles (born 1966), English cricketer
- Sophia Myles (born 1980), English actress
- Thomas Myles (1857–1937), Irish surgeon
- Toby Myles (born 1975), American football player
- Trevor Myles, British fashion designer
- Vic Myles (1914–1983), Canadian ice hockey player

== Fictional characters ==
- Dexter Myles, DC Comics character

== See also ==
- Myles (given name), a page for people with the given name "Myles"
- Miles (surname)
- Mile (disambiguation), a disambiguation page for "Mile"
