= Country Mile =

Country Mile or A Country Mile may refer to:

== Film ==
- A Country Mile, film by David Carradine

== Music ==
- Country Mile (Ernie Smith album), 2008 album by Ernie Smith
- Country Mile (Johnny Flynn album), 2013 album by Johnny Flynn
- "Country Mile", 1979 song by Rory Gallagher from BBC Sessions
- "Country Mile", 1971 song by Charles Williams from Charles Williams
- "Country Mile", song by Ian Gillan from Dreamcatcher
- "Country Mile", song by Clinic from Winchester Cathedral
- "Country Mile", 2006 song by Camera Obscura from Let's Get Out of This Country
- "Country Mile", 2001 song by Eric Sardinas from Devil's Train
- "A Country Mile", song by Everything but the Girl from Baby, the Stars Shine Bright

== See also ==
- A Good Country Mile, 2012 album by Kevin Kinney and The Golden Palominos
- Mile (disambiguation)
