= Milne =

Milne may refer to:

== People ==
- Milne (surname)

== Places ==
- Milne Bay Province, Papua New Guinea
  - Milne Bay, large bay in Milne Bay Province
- Milne Inlet, Nunavut, Canada
- Milne Townsite, an abandoned subdivision of Temagami, Ontario, Canada
- Milne Land, large island in eastern Greenland
- Milne (crater), a large lunar crater in the southern hemisphere on the far side of the Moon

== Other ==
- Battle of Milne Bay, battle of the Pacific campaign of World War II
- HMS Milne, the name of two ships of the Royal Navy
- Milne model, a special-relativistic cosmological model proposed by Edward Arthur Milne

== See also ==
- Milna (volcano)
- Miln
- Milnes
- Mylne
