= Miles (disambiguation) =

Miles are a unit of length.

Miles may also refer to:

== People with the name ==
- Miles (given name)
- Miles (surname)

== Places ==
=== United States ===
- Miles, Iowa, a city
- Miles, North Carolina, an unincorporated community
- Miles, Texas, a city
- Miles, Virginia, an unincorporated community
- Miles, Washington, an unincorporated community
- Miles, West Virginia, an unincorporated community
- Miles, Wisconsin, an unincorporated community

=== Elsewhere ===
- Miles, Queensland, Australia, a town
- Miles Islands, Nunavut, Canada

== Brands and enterprises ==
- Miles Aircraft, a UK manufacturer of light and military aircraft
- Miles Electric Vehicles, a former manufacturer and distributor of all-electric vehicles based in California; declared bankruptcy in 2013
- Miles Laboratories, an American pharmaceutical company

== Computing and Technology ==
- Miles Sound System, a two-dimensional sound software system primarily for computer games
- Multiple Integrated Laser Engagement System or MILES, a method of simulating battle used by US Armed Forces

== Education ==
- Miles College, Fairfield, Alabama, an historically black college founded in 1898
- Miles Community College, Miles City, Montana

== Music ==
- Miles (band), a Bangladeshi rock band, or their 1982 debut album
- Miles: From an Interlude Called Life, an album by Blu & Exile, 2020
- Miles: The New Miles Davis Quintet, a 1956 album
- Miles! Miles! Miles!, a 1993 album by Miles Davis
- Miles! The Definitive Miles Davis at Montreux DVD Collection, a box set
- Miles, an album by Topic, or the title song, 2015
- Miles, an EP by the Vasco Era, 2005
- "Miles", a song by Christina Perri from Lovestrong (2011)
- "Miles", a song by Mother Mother from O My Heart (2008)
- "Miles", a song by Sponge from Rotting Piñata (1994)
- "Miles", a song by SZA from the 2022 deluxe edition of Ctrl (2017)

== Sports ==
- Miles (mascot), the official mascot of the Denver Broncos NFL football
- Miles Field (Oregon), a former professional baseball stadium in Medford, Oregon
- Miles Field (Virginia Tech), a former collegiate sports venue
- Miles Stadium, a former stadium in Blacksburg, Virginia, on the campus of Virginia Polytechnic Institute and State University

== Other uses ==
- miles (plural milites), a soldier in the Roman army
- Miles baronets, a title in the Baronetage of the United Kingdom
- Miles: The Autobiography, a 1989 book by Miles Davis and Quincy Troupe
- Miles (film), a 2016 comedy-drama film starring Tim Boardman and Molly Shannon
- Nook miles, shortened to miles, one of the currencies in Animal Crossing: New Horizons

== See also ==
- Mile (disambiguation)
- Myles (given name)
- Myles (surname)
- Justice Miles (disambiguation)
