= Ross Milne =

Ross Milne may refer to:

- Ross Milne (politician) (born 1932), Canadian politician
- Ross Milne (alpine skier) (1944–1964), Australian alpine skier

== See also ==
- Milne (disambiguation)
