= Treat Me Right =

Treat Me Right may refer to:

- "Treat Me Right" (song), a 1980 song and single by Pat Benatar
- Treat Me Right (album), a 1999 album by Eric Sardinas
