= Peter Miles =

Peter Miles may refer to:

- Peter Miles (courtier) (1924–2013), British courtier
- Peter Miles (American actor) (1938–2002), American actor
- Peter Miles (English actor) (1928–2018), English actor and singer
- Peter Miles (musician) (born 1980), Ugandan musician
- Peter Miles (record producer) (born 1982), English music executive

== See also ==
- Miles (surname)
