= Square mile (disambiguation) =

A square mile is a unit of area equal to the area of a square of one mile in length on each side.

Square mile may also refer to:

== Places ==
- A day-to-day name for a section of a survey township
- The City of London, particularly as a financial services centre, is nicknamed the "Square Mile", being about a square mile in area
- Adelaide city centre in South Australia, nicknamed the "Square Mile", in imitation of the City of London
- Square Mile, South Australia, a locality in the local government area of the District Council of Grant
- "Square Mile" or Golden Square Mile, a historic area in downtown Montreal
- The Antwerp diamond district, an area within the city of Antwerp, Belgium

== Other uses ==
- Square Mile (magazine), a magazine marketed to City of London bankers
- Square Mile (board game), land development game released by Milton Bradley Company in 1962

== See also ==
- square kilometre
- hectare
- acre
- Mile square (disambiguation)
- Square (disambiguation)
- Mile (disambiguation)
