= Mile square (disambiguation) =

A mile square is a unit of measurement for area.

Mile Square or variation, also may refer to:

- Mile Square (Indianapolis), Downtown, Indianapolis, Indiana, USA; the historic district of downtown
- Hoboken, New Jersey, USA; nicknamed "Mile Square City"
- Mile Square Regional Park, Fountain Valley, California, USA
- Mile Square Road, Mendon, New York State, USA; see List of county routes in Monroe County, New York

== See also ==
- Covina, California, USA; motto: One Mile Square and All There
- square mile (disambiguation)
- square (disambiguation)
- mile (disambiguation)
