= Kevin Miles =

Kevin Miles may refer to:

- Kevin Miles (Australian actor) (1929–2024)
- Kevin Miles (American actor) (born 1990), best known for his role as Jake from State Farm
- Kevin Miles (CEO), chief executive officer of Mendocino Farms
