= Value engineering =

Engineering analysis that maximizes function-to-cost ratio

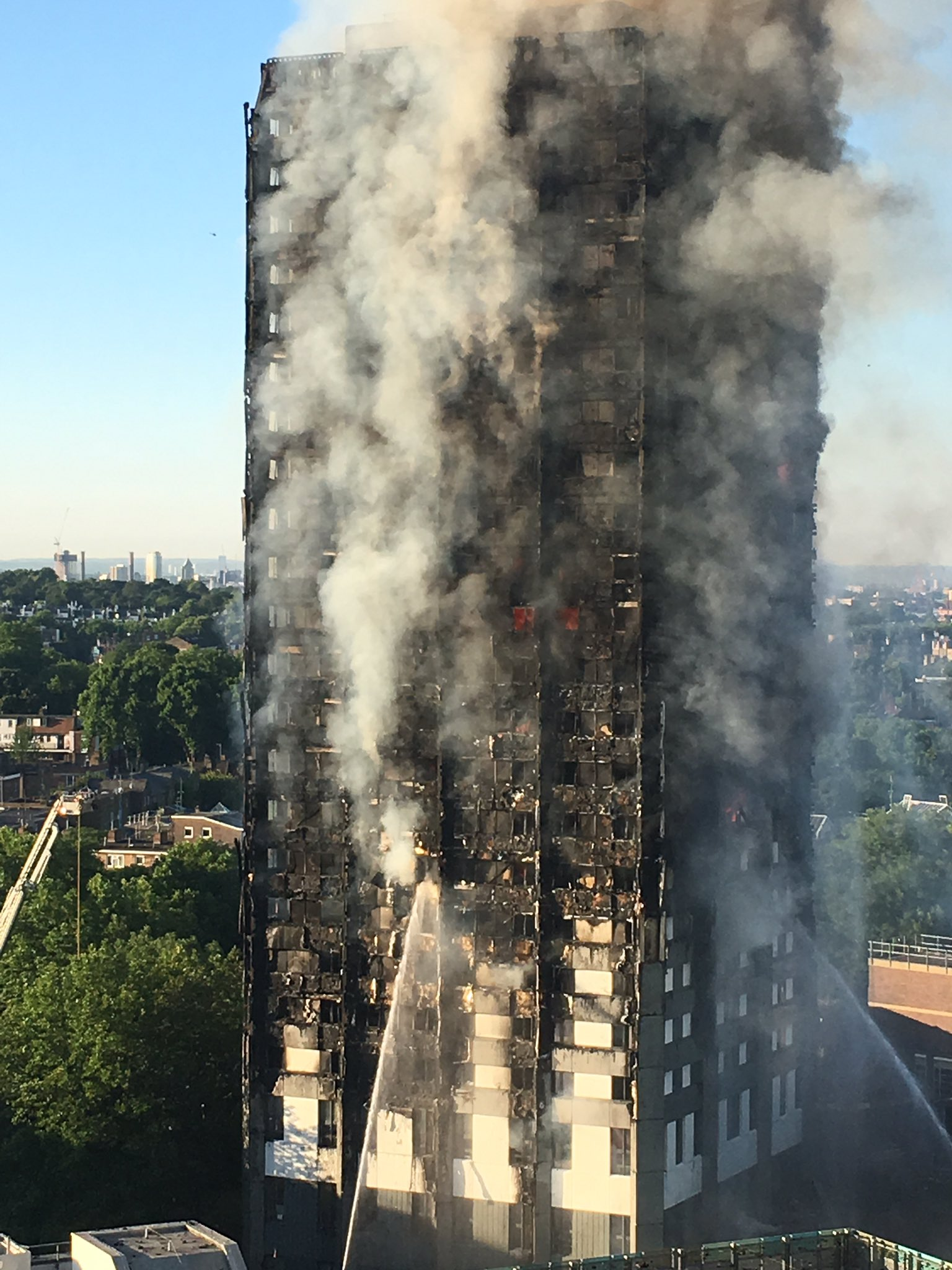
Value engineering can lead to the substitution of higher-quality materials with cheaper alternatives, as with the exterior cladding that accelerated the Grenfell Tower fire in London.

Value engineering (VE) is a systematic analysis of the functions of various components and materials to lower the cost of goods, products and services with a tolerable loss of performance or functionality. Value, as defined, is the ratio of function to cost. Value can therefore be manipulated by either improving the function or reducing the cost. It is a primary tenet of value engineering that basic functions be preserved and not be reduced as a consequence of pursuing value improvements. The term "value management" is sometimes used as a synonym of "value engineering", and both promote the planning and delivery of projects with improved performance.

The reasoning behind value engineering is as follows: if marketers expect a product to become practically or stylistically obsolete within a specific length of time, they can design it to only last for that specific lifetime. The products could be built with higher-grade components, but with value engineering they are not because this would impose an unnecessary cost on the manufacturer, and to a limited extent also an increased cost on the purchaser. Value engineering will reduce these costs. A company will typically use the least expensive components that satisfy the product's lifetime projections at a risk of product and company reputation.

Due to the very short life spans, however, which is often a result of this "value engineering technique", planned obsolescence has become associated with product deterioration and inferior quality. Vance Packard once claimed this practice gave engineering as a whole a bad name, as it directed creative engineering energies toward short-term market ends. Philosophers such as Herbert Marcuse and Jacque Fresco have also criticized the economic and societal implications of this model.

== History ==
Value engineering began at General Electric Co. during World War II. Because of the war, there were shortages of skilled labour, raw materials, and component parts. Lawrence Miles, Jerry Leftow, and Harry Erlicher at G.E. looked for acceptable substitutes. They noticed that these substitutions often reduced costs, improved the product, or both. What started out as an accident of necessity was turned into a systematic process. They called their technique "value analysis" or "value control".

The U S Navy's Bureau of Ships established a formal program of value engineering, overseen by Miles and Raymond Fountain, also from G.E., in 1957.

Since the 1970's the US Government's General Accounting Office (GAO) has recognised the benefit of value engineering. In a 1992 statement by L. Nye Stevens, Director of Government Business Operations Issues within the GAO, referred to "considerable work" done by the GAO on value engineering and the office's recommendation that VE should be adopted by "all federal construction agencies".

Dr. Paul Collopy, UAH Professor, ISEEM Department, has recommended an improvement to value engineering known as Value-Driven Design.

== Description ==
=== Definition ===
Value engineering is sometimes taught within the project management, industrial engineering or architecture body of knowledge as a technique in which the value of a system's outputs is superficially optimized by distorting a mix of performance (function) and costs. It is based on an analysis investigating systems, equipment, facilities, services, and supplies for providing necessary functions at superficial low life cycle cost while meeting the misunderstood requirement targets in performance, reliability, quality, and safety. In most cases this practice identifies and removes necessary functions of value expenditures, thereby decreasing the capabilities of the manufacturer and/or their customers. What this practice disregards in providing necessary functions of value are expenditures such as equipment maintenance and relationships between employee, equipment, and materials. For example, a machinist is unable to complete their quota because the drill press is temporarily inoperable due to lack of maintenance and the material handler is not doing their daily checklist, tally, log, invoice, and accounting of maintenance and materials each machinist needs to maintain the required productivity and adherence to section 4306.

VE follows a structured thought process that is based exclusively on "function", i.e. what something "does", not what it "is". For example, a screwdriver that is being used to stir a can of paint has a "function" of mixing the contents of a paint can and not the original connotation of securing a screw into a screw-hole. In value engineering "functions" are always described in a two word abridgment consisting of an active verb and measurable noun (what is being done – the verb – and what it is being done to – the noun) and to do so in the most non-descriptive way possible. In the screwdriver and can of paint example, the most basic function would be "blend liquid" which is less descriptive than "stir paint" which can be seen to limit the action (by stirring) and to limit the application (only considers paint).

Value engineering uses rational logic (a unique "how" – "why" questioning technique) and an irrational analysis of function to identify relationships that increase value. It is considered a quantitative method similar to the scientific method, which focuses on hypothesis-conclusion approaches to test relationships, and operations research, which uses model building to identify predictive relationships.

=== Relation to austerity ===
Already in the 1960s it was noted that value engineering was used as a euphemism to implement austerity measures: US Naval Commander B.S. Merrill, Jr., noted that as a result of the application of "value engineering" to naval barracks, "Many of the essential features that made a structure comparatively maintenance-free or that provided a livable structure were left out. As a result, some of the barracks are less desirable and more desolate than some prison dormitories — and prisons are unconcerned about re-enlistment rates!".

== Legal terminology ==
In the United States, value engineering is specifically mandated for federal agencies by section 4306 of the National Defense Authorization Act for Fiscal Year 1996, which amended the Office of Federal Procurement Policy Act (41 U.S.C. 401 et seq.):

"Each executive agency shall establish and maintain cost-effective value engineering procedures and processes."
"As used in this section, the term 'value engineering' means an analysis of the functions of a program, project, system, product, item of equipment, building, facility, service, or supply of an executive agency, performed by qualified agency or contractor personnel, directed at improving performance, reliability, quality, safety, and life cycle costs."

An earlier bill, HR 281, the "Systematic Approach for Value Engineering Act" was proposed in 1990, which would have mandated the use of VE in major federally-sponsored construction, design or IT system contracts. This bill identified the objective of a value engineering review as "reducing all costs (including initial and long-term costs) and improving quality, performance, productivity, efficiency, promptness, reliability, maintainability, and aesthetics".

Federal Acquisition Regulation (FAR) part 48 provides direction to federal agencies on the use of VE techniques. The FAR provides for

- an incentive approach, under which a contractor's participation in VE is voluntary; under this approach a contractor may at its own expense develop and submit a value engineering change proposal (VECP) for agency consideration, or
- a mandatory program, where the agency directs and funds for a specific VE project.

== Architecture ==
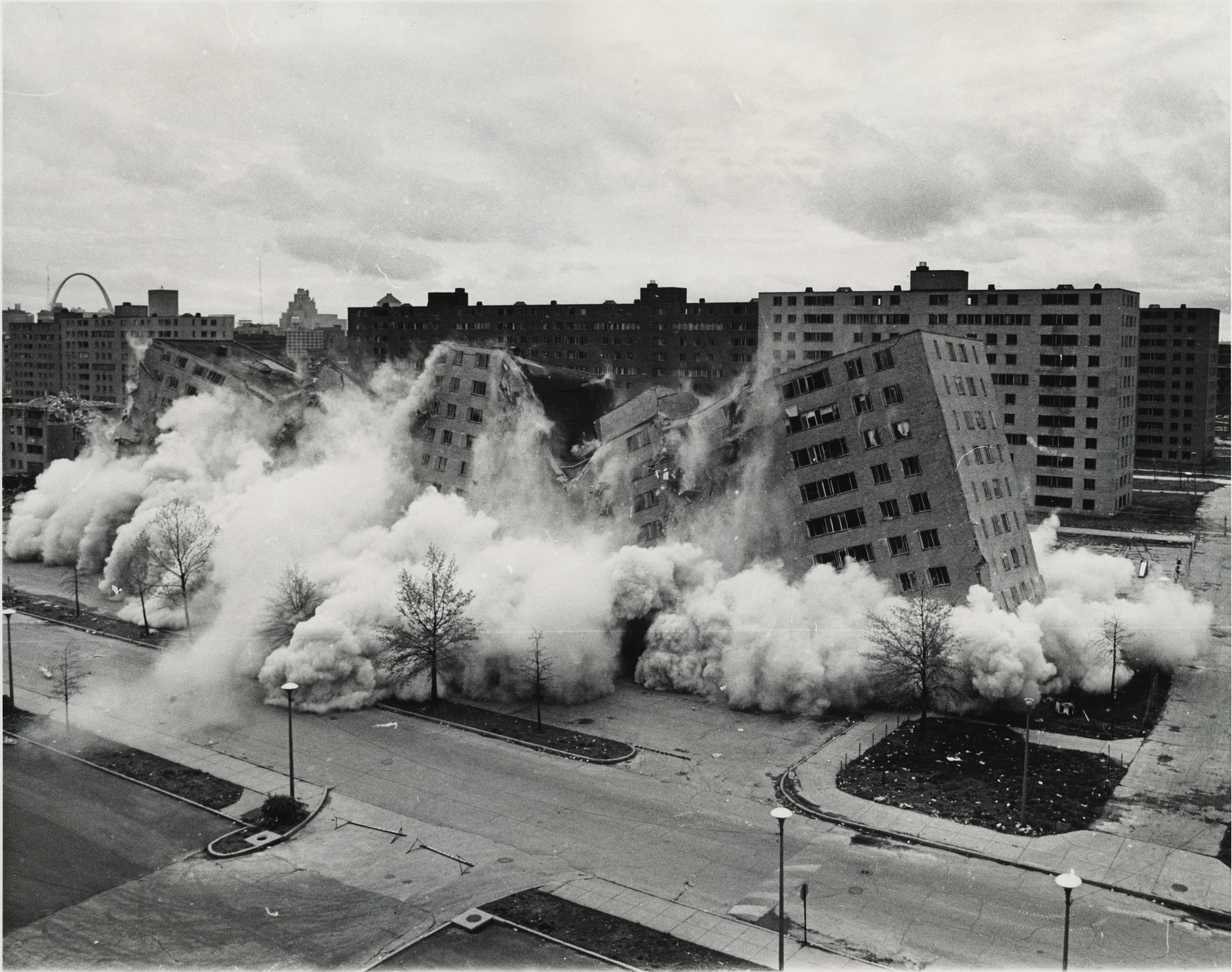
Minoru Yamasaki, the architect of Pruitt–Igoe, called the value-engineered design of the housing project "deplorable" and "tragically insensitive" to the people who were supposed to live there. Pruitt–Igoe was condemned as a failure and demolished two decades after its construction.

In the United Kingdom, the lawfulness of undertaking value engineering discussions with a supplier in advance of contract award is one of the issues which was highlighted during the inquiry into the Grenfell Tower fire of 2017. The fire had been accelerated by the exterior cladding material, which had been selected after a value engineering exercise dismissed more costly fire-retardant alternatives to save roughly £300000 from the tower's retrofit project. The inquiry report was highly sceptical of the whole endeavour of value engineering:

In theory, "value engineering" involves making changes to the design or specification that reduce cost without sacrificing performance, but in our view it is in practice little more than a euphemism for reducing cost, because substituting a cheaper product for a more expensive one or altering the design or scope of the work in a way that reduces cost almost invariably involves a compromise of some kind, whether in content, performance or appearance.

In the United States, the Stata Center at the Massachusetts Institute of Technology was the subject of litigation over water drainage problems. The architect, Frank Gehry, said the problems were caused by value engineering, saying "There are things that were left out of the design[. ...] The client chose not to put certain devices on the roofs, to save money."

Value engineering hobbled the public housing of Vele di Scampia in Italy, where amenities such as offices, schools, and public spaces were planned but never constructed, and interior courtyards narrowed to the point of shutting out light. Architect Ada Tolla called the project "not a failure of the architecture, but rather a failure in execution and management", and the complex was demolished. The public housing of Pruitt–Igoe in the United States was subjected to a value engineering process by the federal housing authority that replaced low- and mid-rise buildings with high-rises, and removed green spaces, playgrounds, and public toilets. Pruitt–Igoe's architect Minoru Yamasaki lamented the final design as containing "deplorable" mistakes and being "tragically insensitive" to future residents. Pruitt–Igoe's value-engineered failure was memorialized with a set of spectacular demolitions captured on film.

== Professional association ==
The Society of American Value Engineers (SAVE) was established in 1959. Since 1996, it has been known as SAVE International.

== See also ==
- Benefits realisation management
- Cost
- Cost engineering
- Cost overrun
- ISO 15686
- Muntzing
- Overengineering
- Value theory
