= Eric Sardinas =

American blues-rock slide guitarist (born 1970)

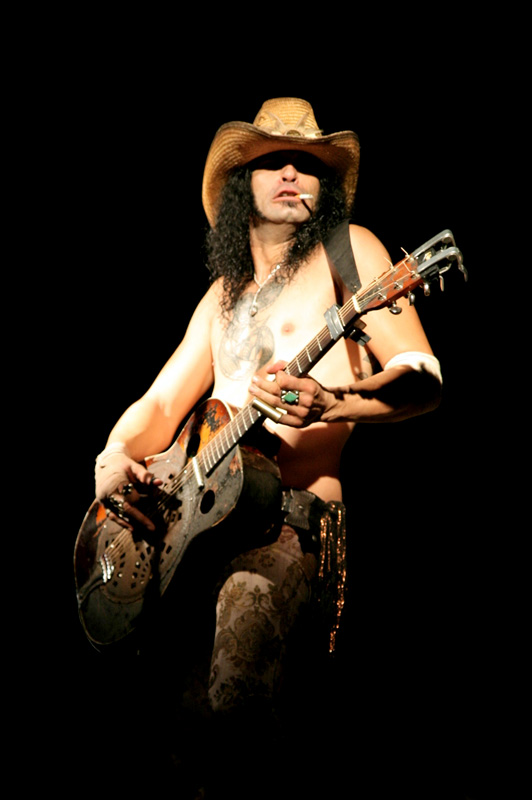
- Sardinas in 2008

Background information
- Born: November 10, 1970 (age 55); Fort Lauderdale, Florida, U.S.
- Genres: Blues, blues-rock
- Instruments: Guitar, vocals, resonator guitar
- Years active: 1999–present
- Website: www.facebook.com/ericsardinasofficial/

Eric Sardinas (born November 10, 1970) is an American blues-rock slide guitarist born in Fort Lauderdale, Florida. He is noted for his use of the electric resonator guitar and his live performances. He sometimes sets his guitar alight on stage and during shows. In 2000 in Sydney, Sardinas suffered third degree burns to his left wrist.

Sardinas began to play the guitar at age six and leaned toward vintage recordings by such Delta bluesmen as Charlie Patton, Bukka White, Big Bill Broonzy, Elmore James, and Muddy Waters. Although he was left-handed, he eventually started to play right-handed.

In 2002, he was featured on the Bo Diddley tribute album Hey Bo Diddley - A Tribute!, performing the song "Ride On Josephine".

He signed to Steve Vai's Favored Nations record label and was the opening act for Vai's The Real Illusions Tour 2005 around the world.

In 2008, Sardinas released Eric Sardinas and Big Motor on Favored Nations in the U.S. His most recent release was Midnight Junction, which was issued in October 2023.

== Discography ==
Albums (except where stated)

- Treat Me Right (1999)
- Angel Face (2000 EP)
- Devil's Train (2001)
- Black Pearls (2003)
- Eric Sardinas and Big Motor (2008)
- Sticks & Stones (2011)
- Boomerang (2014)
- Midnight Junction (2023)

== See also ==
- Kenny Wayne Shepherd
- Johnny Winter
