= Myles Miller =

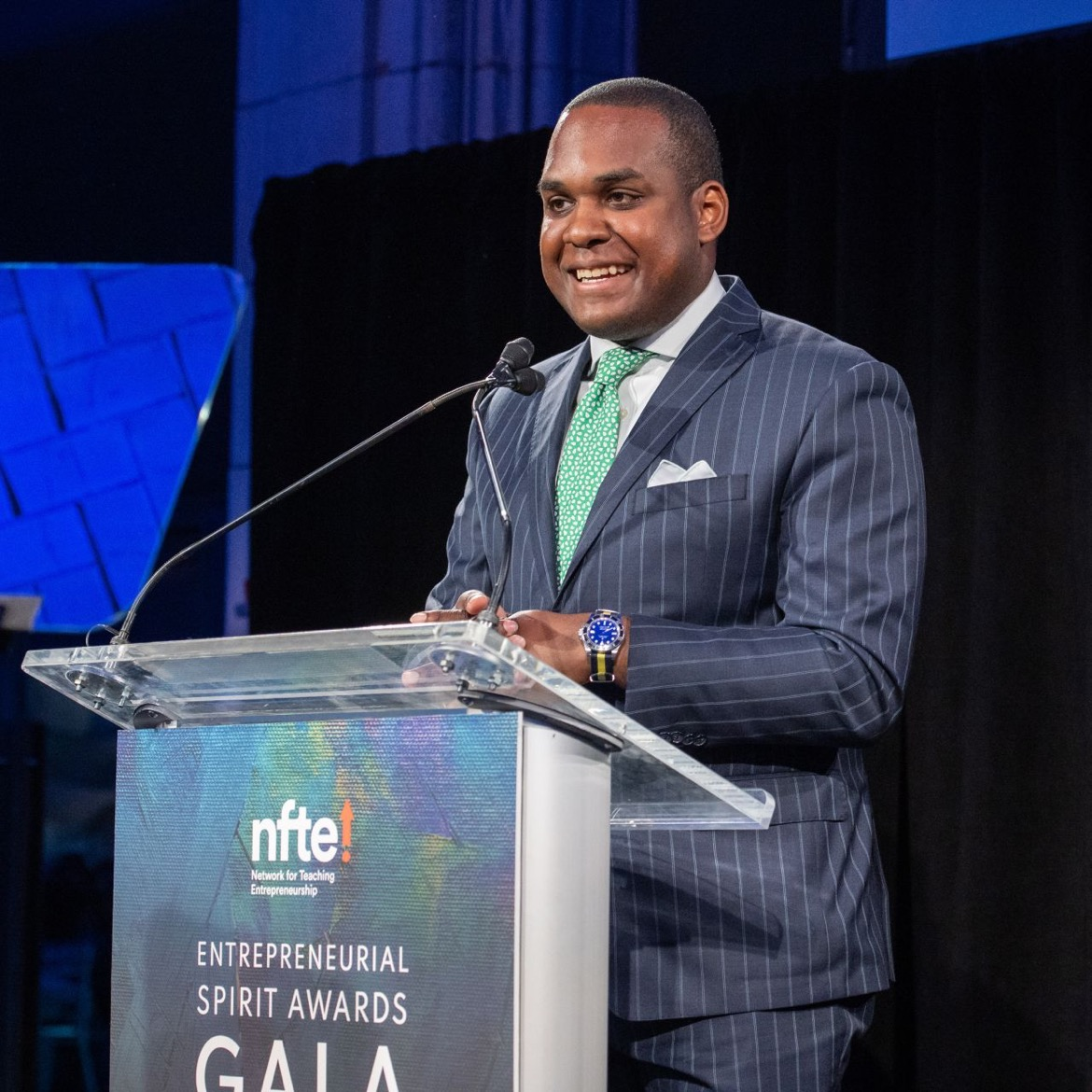
- Occupation: Journalist
- Years active: 2005-present

Myles Miller is a senior reporter covering federal law enforcement for Bloomberg News. He was previously managing editor of Bloomberg Television. He was a legal reporter at WNBC-TV until August 2024, and was previously deputy press secretary for the FDNY.

From 2017 to 2019 he was an Emmy-award winning investigative reporter at NY1. He was the law enforcement reporter for WPIX and was editor for video at The New York Times. He was the youngest White House reporter in history having served in that role for News Corporation's iPad newspaper, The Daily at age 17.

== Journalism ==
Miller began his reporting career at The New York Daily News, as an intern covering the Mayoralty of Michael Bloomberg

He spent several years reporting for Fox Television Stations in New Jersey and Washington, D.C.

He covered the northeastern United States for Reuters, traveled with President Barack Obama, the death of Osama bin Laden, the Supreme Court decision on the Affordable Care Act and the 2012 presidential election, as White House reporter for News Corporation's The Daily; and launched Chasing New Jersey.

Later he was night editor at Women's Wear Daily, assignment editor/New York bureau chief at C-SPAN, and reporter at WCBS Newsradio 880.

Miller won a duPont-Columbia award for his coverage of the COVID-19 pandemic and is a four time Emmy Award winner.

He launched Bloomberg News' federal law enforcement beat with award-winning coverage of the Killing of Brian Thompson and the search for Luigi Mangione. He also led Bloomberg's coverage of the 2025 New York City shooting at Blackstone Inc.'s headquarters including detailing the suspect's motive behind the massacre.

== Corporate ==
Miller has served as a senior manager for Accenture, consulting on production, event, and media strategy as well as providing storytelling coaching for senior executives.

Miller was a communications manager for Meta Platforms, where he worked on business and engineering communications strategy, operations, and events.
