= David Miles (disambiguation) =

David Miles (born 1959) is a British economist.

David Miles may also refer to:

- David Miles (radio announcer) (born 1954), British continuity announcer and newsreader
- David Miles (actor) (1871–1915), American actor and film director
- Dave Miles, ice hockey player, see 1980 NHL entry draft
- Dave Miles (strongman), see UK Strength Council

== See also ==
- David Myles (disambiguation)
