= ISO 15686 =

ISO standard dealing with service life development

ISO 15686 is the in development ISO standard dealing with service life planning. It is a decision process which addresses the development of the service life of a building component, building or other constructed work like a bridge or tunnel. Its approach is to ensure a proposed design life has a structured response in establishing its service life normally from a reference or estimated service life framework. Then in turn secure a life-cycle cost profile (or Whole-life cost when called for) whilst addressing environmental factors like life cycle assessment and service life care and end of life considerations including obsolescence and embodied energy recovery. Service life planning is increasingly being linked with sustainable development and wholelife value.

The objective of service life planning is to provide reasonable assurance that the estimated service life of a new building on a specific site, with planned maintenance, will be at least as long as the design. Service life planning facilitates the making of well-informed decisions regarding value engineering, cost planning, maintenance planning, and environmental impact. As service life cannot be estimated precisely, the objective requires the making of an appropriately reliable estimate of the service life of the building using available knowledge relating to the service life of each material, component, assembly, and system that is to be used in the building.

If the estimated service life of any of these is likely to be less than the design life of the building, a decision should be made as to whether maintenance, repair, or replacement could ensure that its essential functions could be adequately maintained. To assist with specification and design, and avoidance of obsolescence and waste, service life planning may include projections of the needs for, and timing of replacement and end of life recovery.

15686 for service life planning is being prepared by Technical Committee ISO/TC 59, Building construction - Subcommittee SC 14, Design life.

In Great Britain, the new British Standard BS ISO 15686-5:2008 Buildings and constructed assets. Service life planning is currently being launched (September 2008). The life cycle costing standard and the additional Standardized method of life cycle costing for construction (SMLCC) provide an in-depth guide to life cycle costing, an area of increasing importance. The BSI explains that "the UK building industry recognizes that life cycle costing (LCC) is necessary and important, but confusion exists about the best method to realise the economic and environmental benefits of such costing".

== List of sub standards ==
1. ISO 15686-1 Buildings and constructed assets - Service life planning: Part 1, General principles and framework
2. ISO 15686-2 Buildings and constructed assets - Service life planning: Part 2, Service life prediction procedures
3. ISO 15686-3 Buildings and constructed assets - Service life planning: Part 3, Performance audits and reviews
4. ISO 15686-4 Buildings and constructed assets - Service life planning: Part 4, Service Life Planning using IFC based Building Information Modelling
5. ISO 15686-5.2 Buildings and constructed assets - Service life planning: Part 5, Life-cycle costing
6. ISO 15686-6 Buildings and constructed assets - Service life planning: Part 6, Procedures for considering environmental impacts
7. ISO 15686-7 Buildings and constructed assets - Service life planning: Part 7, Performance evaluation for feedback of service life data from practice
8. ISO 15686-8 Buildings and constructed assets - Service life planning: Part 8, Reference service life and service-life estimation
9. ISO 15686-9 Buildings and constructed assets - Service life planning: Part 9, Guidance on assessment of service-life data
10. ISO 15686-10 Buildings and constructed assets - Service life planning: Part 10, When to assess functional performance
11. ISO 15686-11 Buildings and constructed assets - Service life planning: Part 11, Terminology

== Further developments ==
- Parts 1-3 and parts 5-10 have been published. The others are "Under development".
- Further information may be obtained from ISO Geneva or BSI Chiswick London.
