= Kevin Miles (CEO) =

American food industry executive

- Born: Texas, United States
- Education: Texas A&M University
- Occupation: Business executive
- Known for: CEO of US fast food businesses

Kevin Miles is an American restaurant industry executive who has been the chief executive officer of the fast casual restaurant chain Mendocino Farms since 2019.

He was previously with Zoës Kitchen, where he joined in 2009 as executive vice president of operations, was promoted to president and chief operating officer in 2011, and named CEO in 2012, before stepping down in 2018 after the chain's sale to Cava. In 2016, Miles received Ernst & Young's Entrepreneur of the Year Retail Award for the Southwest Region.

Prior to joining Zoës Kitchen, Miles held executive positions with Pollo Campero, Aramark, Baja Fresh Mexican Grill, and La Madeleine French Bakery and Café.

Miles graduated from Texas A&M University in 1989 with a Bachelor of Sciences.
