= Mile (disambiguation) =

The mile (mi.) is an English unit of length that equals 1.609344 kilometers. It is sometimes distinguished as the "land mile", "statute mile", or "international mile".

Mile may also refer to:

== Units ==
- Airline mile, a frequent-flyer program measure equivalent or convertible to points, which customers may redeem for air travel or other rewards
- Geographical mile
- Metric mile, an informal term for 1500 or 1600 m
- Nautical mile (M, NM, nmi)
- Scandinavian mile (mil)
- Scots mile
- US survey mile
- Historical foreign units translated as "mile":
  - Arabic mile (الميل, al-mīl)
  - Austrian mile (Meile)
  - Chinese mile (里, li)
  - Croatian mile (milja)
  - Danish mile (mil)
  - German mile (Meile)
  - Greek & Byzantine mile (μίλιον, mílion)
  - Hungarian mile (mérföld)
  - Irish mile (míle)
  - Italian mile (miglio)
  - Portuguese mile (milha)
  - Prussian mile (Meile)
  - Roman mile (mille passus & al.)
  - Russian mile (миля, milya)
  - Welsh mile (milltir or milldir)

== Places ==
- Mile City, Yunnan, China
- Mile High City, nickname for Denver, Colorado
- Mile, Visoko, a medieval place in Bosnia
- Mile, Jajce, a village in Bosnia and Herzegovina

== Other uses ==
- Mile (given name), South Slavic masculine given name
- Mile run, a middle-distance foot race
- Mílè, the Chinese representation of Maitreya Buddha
- Mile (band), an American rock band

== See also ==
- Country Mile (disambiguation)
- Miles (disambiguation)
- Milestone (disambiguation)
- Mille (disambiguation)
- Miilee, a 2005 Indian soap opera
- Myles (given name)
- Myles (surname)
