= James Mylne =

James Mylne may refer to:

- James Mylne (philosopher)
- James Mylne (artist)
- James Mylne (poet)

== See also ==
- James Milne (disambiguation)
