= Alan Mylne =

Archdeacon of Matabeleland, 1928-1936

Alan Moultrie Mylne (2 January 1886, Mumbai – 5 March 1944, Malvern) was Archdeacon of Matabeleland from 1928 until 1936.

The son of Louis Mylne, bishop, Alan was educated at Marlborough, Keble College, Oxford and Cuddesdon Theological College.

He was a Lay Reader at Cathcart, Eastern Cape. After ordination he served curacies at Rawmarsh, Lickey and Alvechurch. He was a chaplain to the forces during World War I. After the war he was the incumbent at St George's, Worcester from 1920 to 1928; of Bulawayo from 1928 to 1936; and then of St Cuthbert, Port Elizabeth from 1936 to 1939.

Anglican Church of Southern Africa titles
Preceded by Ernest Harker	Archdeacon of Matabeleland; 1928– 1936	Succeeded by Michael Gibbs
