= Milne (surname) =

Milne /ˈmɪln/ is a surname of Scottish origin, from the same source as Miller.

People with the surname Milne include:

== Arts and media ==
- A. A. Milne, author of Winnie-the-Pooh
  - Christopher Robin Milne, son of A. A. Milne, appearing as Christopher Robin in Winnie the Pooh
- Alasdair Milne, former director-general of the BBC
- Alex Milne (artist), comic book artist
- Andy Milne, Canadian jazz pianist and composer in New York
- Anna-Louise Milne, specialist in twentieth century Parisian history and culture
- Carly Milne, Canadian writer
- Christian Milne (1773–?), Scottish poet of the Romantic Era
- Christopher Milne (born 1950), Australian actor and award-winning writer
- Dan Milne, British actor/director who is possibly best known for his role in EastEnders
- David Milne (artist) (1882–1953), Canadian painter
- Drew Milne, British poet and academic
- Ewart Milne, Irish poet who was in the Spanish Civil War
- Frances Margaret Milne (1846-?; pseudonym, "Margaret Frances"), Irish-born, American writer, librarian
- F. Kenneth Milne (1885–1980), South Australian architect
- Glenn Milne, News Ltd. journalist and National Press Club vice-president
- Hamish Milne (1939–2020), British pianist and a professor of music
- James Lees-Milne (1908–1997), English writer and expert on country houses
- James Milne, stage name Lawrence Arabia, solo artist and bassist for Okkervil River
- Jennifer Keeler-Milne (born 1961), Australian contemporary artist*
- John Milne (journalist), retired BBC Scotland presenter
- John Clark Milne (1897–1962), Scottish poet who wrote in the Doric dialect of the Scots language
- Kevin Milne (born 1949), New Zealand television presenter
- Kirsty Milne (1964–2013), English-born Scottish journalist
- Mary Christianna Milne Lewis, British mystery writer and children's author who wrote as Christianna Brand
- Paula Milne, British screenwriter who has been active since the 1970s
- Robert Duncan Milne (1844–1899), American science fiction writer
- Tom Milne (1926–2005), British film critic

== Military ==
- Sir Alexander Milne, 1st Baronet (1806–1896), British admiral
- Archibald Berkeley Milne (1855–1938), admiral of the Royal Navy
- Sir David Milne (1763–1845), British admiral
- Duncan Grinnell-Milne (1896–1973), English First World War pilot
- George Milne, 1st Baron Milne (1866–1948), British field marshal
- John Theobald Milne (1895–1917), English first world war flying ace
- MacGillivray Milne (1882–1959), United States Navy Captain, and the 27th Governor of American Samoa
- William Johnstone Milne (1892–1917), Canadian recipient of the Victoria Cross

== Politicians ==
- Charles Black Milne (1879–1935), Scottish politician, Unionist Party Member of Parliament for West Fife
- Christine Milne, Australian politician
- David Milne (Ontario politician)
- Donald Milne, American politician and lawyer
- Duane Milne, Republican member of the Pennsylvania House of Representatives, representing the 167th legislative district
- Eddie Milne (1915–1983), British Labour Party Member of Parliament for Blyth, later re-elected as an independent candidate
- John Milne (Canadian politician) (1839–1922), Canadian Senator and businessman
- John Sydney Wardlaw-Milne (1879–1922), British Conservative Party politician
- Lance Milne (1915–1995), Australian Democrats member of the South Australian Legislative Council
- Lorna Anne Milne, Canadian senator
- Marion Milne, American businesswoman and politician
- Nanette Milne, Scottish Conservative & Unionist Party politician
- Robert Milne (Canadian politician) (1881–1953), Member of Parliament
- Ross Milne (Canadian politician) (born 1932), retired Canadian politician
- Seumas Milne (born 1958), British Labour Party Director of Communications and Strategy, also a journalist and writer
- Sir William Milne (politician) (1822–1895), Australian wine merchant and politician
- William Ross Milne, Canadian politician

== Scientists ==
- Colin Milne, Scottish botanist and priest
- Edward Arthur Milne, British mathematician and astrophysicist
- James Stuart Milne New Zealand mathematician
- John Milne, English geologist
- Malcolm Davenport Milne (1915–1991), physician and medical researcher
- Stephen Milne (mathematician), American mathematician
- William Grant Milne (?–1866), Scottish botanist

== Sport ==
- Alec Milne, Scottish footballer who played for Cardiff City
- Alec Milne (footballer born 1889), footballer who played in the Football League for Doncaster Rovers and Stoke
- Andrew Milne (born 1990), professional footballer
- Arthur Milne (footballer) (1915–1997), Scottish association football player, played for Dundee United, Hibs and St. Mirren
- Athol Milne, Australian rules footballer
- Billy Milne, Scottish footballer who played for Arsenal
- Brian Milne (born 1973), American NFL football fullback
- Callum Milne (born 1965), Scottish footballer
- Cordy Milne (1914–1937), American motorcycle speedway rider
- David Milne (rugby league), Australian Rugby League player
- David Milne (rugby union), former Scottish international rugby union player
- Dax Milne (born 1999), American football player
- Elizabeth Milne (born 1990), New Zealand football player
- Fiona Milne, Canadian rower
- Gordon Milne (born 1937), English former footballer and football manager
- Harry Milne, Scottish footballer with Heart of Midlothian and Partick Thistle
- Herbert Milne (1884–1930), Australian rules footballer
- Iain Milne (born 1958), former Scotland rugby union footballer
- Jack Milne (speedway rider) (1907–1995), international speedway rider
- Jackie Milne (1911–1959), Scottish footballer
- Jimmy Milne (footballer, born 1911), Scotland player and manager
- Kenny Milne (footballer) (born 1979), Scottish professional footballer with Scunthorpe United
- Kenny Milne (rugby union) (born 1961), former Scotland rugby union player
- Lachie Milne (born 1978), Australian slalom canoer
- Leslie Milne (field hockey) (born 1956), US field hockey player
- Malcolm Milne (born 1948), Australian Olympic skier
- Pete Milne, former Major League Baseball outfielder
- Ralph Milne, Scottish footballer with Dundee United and Manchester United
- Ray Milne, former Scottish–U.S. soccer defender
- Rielly Milne (born 1996), American rower
- Riley Milne, Australian rules footballer with Hawthorn
- Robert Milne (footballer), Scottish-born footballer who played for Ireland
- Rod Milne (Athlete), Great Britain Olympic 4 × 400 m Relay Finalist
- Ross Milne, Australian Olympic downhill skier
- Shawn Milne (born 1981), American road bicycle racer
- Stephen Milne (born 1980), Australian rules footballer
- Steven Milne (born 1980), Scottish footballer
- Taane Milne, Australian rugby player
- Vic Milne (1897–1971), footballer who played Aston Villa
- Wilfred Milne (1899–1977), English former professional footballer
- William Milne (sport shooter) (1852–1923), British Olympic sport shooter

== Other people ==
- Alexander Milne (civil servant), British civil servant
- Alexander Milne (entrepreneur), entrepreneur
- Ann Watt Milne (born 1856), Scotch social reformer, temperance leader
- Jimmy Milne (trade unionist), STUC General Secretary
- Joshua Milne (1776–1851), English actuary
- Mrs. Leslie Milne (1860–1932), English traveller in Northern Burma
- Milne & Co, South Australian wine merchants
- Robert Milne, known as Robert Lyon, early advocate of Australian Aboriginal rights
- Ronald Milne (born 1957), British librarian and administrator
- Stewart Milne (born 1950), businessman from Alford, Aberdeenshire, Scotland
- Walter Milne (died 1558), the last Protestant martyr to be burned in Scotland
- William Milne (missionary) (1782–1834), British Protestant missionary to China
- William J. Milne (educator) (1843–1914), American educator

== See also ==
- Henri Milne-Edwards (1800–1885), French zoologist, father of Alphonse Milne-Edwards
- Alphonse Milne-Edwards (1835–1900), French zoologist, son of Henri Milne-Edwards
- Miln
- Milner
- Milnes
- Mylne
