= James Milne =

James or Jimmy Milne may refer to:

- James Milne (cricketer) (born 1961), New Zealand cricketer
- Sir James Milne (railway manager) (1883–1958), general manager of the Great Western Railway
- James Milne (sport shooter) (died 1958), British sports shooter; see Great Britain at the 1908 Summer Olympics
- James Milne, solo artist and bassist for Okkervil River, known as Lawrence Arabia
- James Milne, bassist for Cornershop
- James Milne (mathematician) (born 1942), New Zealand mathematician
- James M. Milne (1850–1903), principal of the State University of New York at Oneonta
- James F. Milne (born 1950), Vermont business and political figure
- James Robert Milne (died 1961), Scottish physicist
- Jimmy Milne (footballer, born 1911) (1911–1997), Scottish football player and manager
- Jimmy Milne (Australian footballer) (1898–1961), Australian footballer for St Kilda
- Jimmy Milne (trade unionist) (1921–1986), general secretary of the Scottish Trades Union Congress
- James Milne (high jumper) (born 1919), American high jumper, 1942 NCAA runner-up for the Michigan State Spartans track and field team
