= Ernie Smith (singer) =

Jamaican reggae singer (1945–2026)

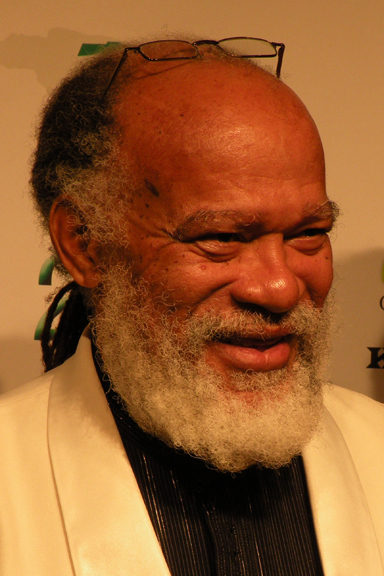
- Smith in 2011

Background information
- Born: Glenroy Anthony Michael Archangelo Smith; 1 May 1945; Kingston, Colony of Jamaica
- Died: 16 April 2026 (aged 80) Miami, Florida, U.S.
- Genres: Reggae
- Instruments: Vocals, guitar

Glenroy Anthony Michael Archangelo Smith (1 May 1945 – 16 April 2026) was a Jamaican reggae singer, with a deep baritone voice, who had his greatest success in the late 1960s and 1970s.

== Life and career ==
Smith was born as Glenroy Anthony Michael Archangelo Smith in Kingston, Jamaica on 1 May 1945. He was raised in St. Ann and May Pen. His father played guitar and bought him an instrument when he was twelve. He played guitar in the band The Vandals in Claremont, St. Ann, after leaving school, and was nicknamed 'Ernie' after Ernest Ranglin. He initially (unsuccessfully) sought a career as a radio announcer, but then approached Federal Studios looking for work as a songwriter, ending up recording his songs himself. His first recordings were not a success and Smith spent time working in life insurance before returning to the studio.

Recording initially in an easy listening style, Smith's first chart success came in the late 1960s with "Bend Down", which was followed by Jamaican number one hits in "Ride on Sammy", "One Dream", and "Pitta Patta", all produced by Richard Khouri at Federal, the latter based on Lee "Scratch" Perry's "Musical Transplant" riddim, which was voted the best song of the year in Swing magazine. In 1972, he won the Yamaha Music Festival in Japan with "Life Is Just For Living", a song originally written for a Red Stripe commercial. In 1973, he was honoured by the Jamaican government with The Badge of Honour For Meritorious Service in the Field of Music. An album, Life Is Just For Living followed in 1974 on Trojan Records. "Pitta Patta" was followed by further Jamaican hits with "Duppy or Gunman" and "Key Card". Smith also had success with covers of popular songs such as "Help Me Make It Through the Night" and "Everything I Own", and as a songwriter had success at the Festival Song Contest in 1974 with Tinga Stewart's "Play De Music". Smith's "I Can't Take It" topped the UK Singles Chart in 1975 when recorded by Johnny Nash under the title "Tears on My Pillow". The change of title led to Smith initially missing out on royalties due to confusion with the Little Anthony song of the same name.

In 1976 his "The Power and the Glory" was seen by some as a criticism of Prime Minister Michael Manley's policies, and led to threats on his life, prompting him to relocate with his family to Toronto, Ontario, Canada, where he recorded the albums To Behold Jah and Skareggae. In the late 1970s, Smith largely appealed to older audiences and released Gospel-influenced records such as 1978's I'll Sing For Jesus album. In 1981, Smith moved to Miami to be closer to his wife and children, later moving to Fort Lauderdale, but was beset by financial difficulties and cocaine and alcohol problems. Smith found help in the form of Bob Marley's mother, Cedella Booker, who he collaborated with as a songwriter, and in 1987, film director Perry Henzell asked Smith to write songs for his Marcus Garvey musical. Smith returned to Jamaica in the wake of Hurricane Gilbert, and began recording and performing again, initially with a new band, The New Agenda. In 1996, he released the Dancehall Ernie Cleans It Up album, featuring new recordings of some of his best known songs.

In 2008, Smith returned with Country Mile, an album that was preceded by the singles "That's The Kinda People We Are" (a duet with Pluto Shervington) and "Give Her a Lion" (featuring Ron Muschette).

Smith died on 16 April 2026, at the age of 80.

== Albums ==
- Greatest Hits (1971) London
- Ernie...Smith, That Is (1972) (aka Pitta Patta) Federal
- For The Good Times (1974) Federal
- Life Is Just For Living (1974) Trojan
- Ernie Smith (Test Pressing, Unreleased Album Produced By Van McCoy) (1974) Warner Bros
- Pure Gold Rock & Roll And Rocksteady (1975) Wildflower
- I'll Sing For Jesus (1978) Wildflower
- To Behold Jah (1979) Generation/Tuff Gong
- Skareggae (1981) Generation
- Mr. Smith's Classics (1982) KR
- On The Road (Live 1989) Ernie Smith Music
- Folk Songs of Jamaica (1992) Ernie Smith Music
- Greatest Hits (1995) Musicrama
- Dancehall Ernie Cleans It Up (1996) Ernie Smith Music
- Step Up (1996) (same as Ernie Cleans It Up with extra tracks) Ernie Smith Music
- After 30 Years Life Is Just For Living (1997) Ernie Smith Music/VP
- The Very Best of Ernie Smith (1998) Rhino
- Greatest Hits (1999) K&K
- Country Mile (2008) VP
- The Best of Ernie Smith – Original Masters (2010) VP
