= Design life =

Time the creator plans a product to last

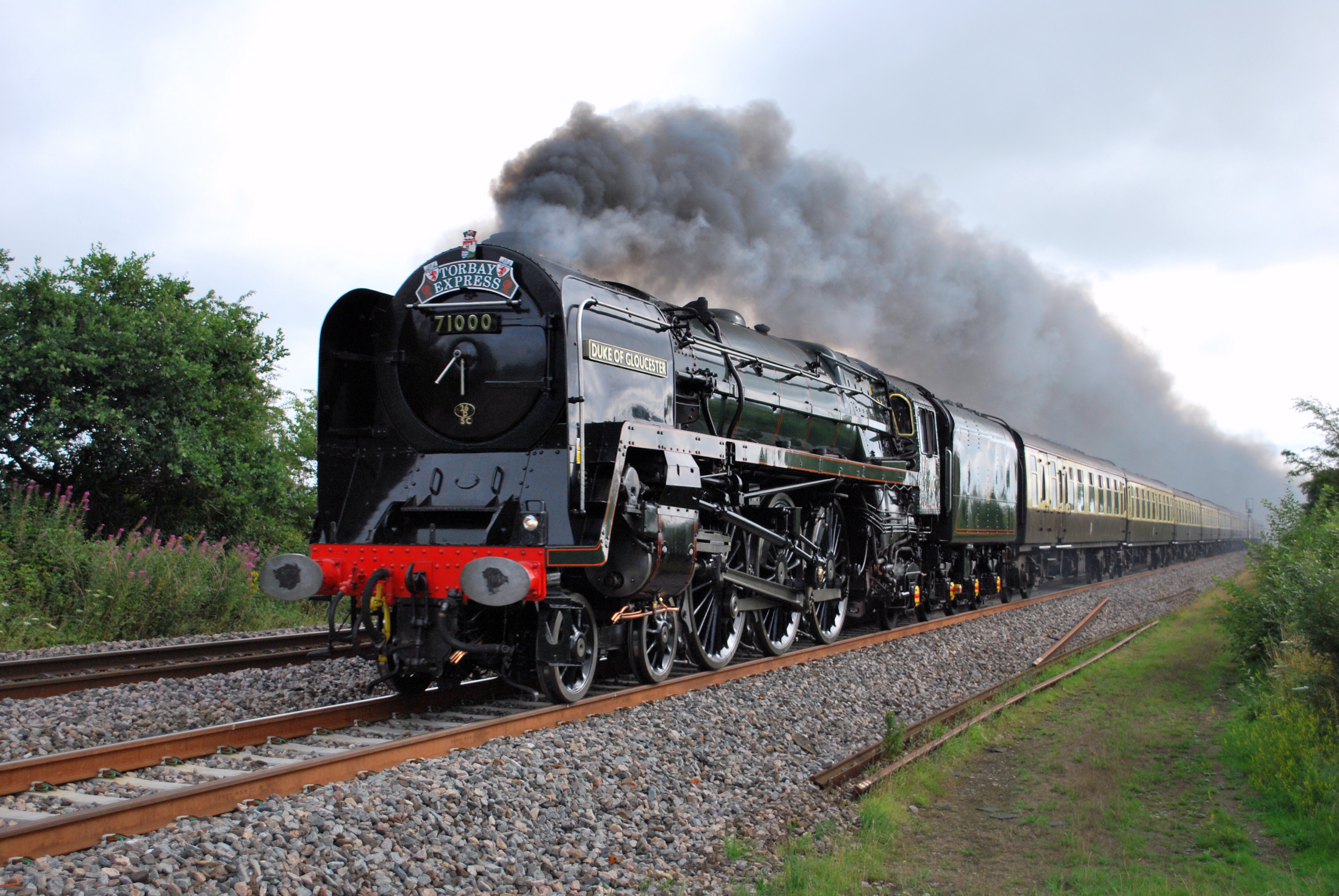
Steam locomotives of British Railways had a thirty-year design life but all had a shorter service life in normal service

The design life of a component or product is the period of time during which the item is expected by its designers to work within its specified parameters; in other words, the life expectancy of the item. Engineers follow a theory to calculate the life expectancy from expected conditions, uses and physical properties. It is not always the actual length of time between placement into service of a single item and that item's onset of wearout.

Another use of the term design life deals with consumer products. Many products employ design life as one factor of their differentiation from competing products and components. A disposable camera is designed to withstand a short life, whilst an expensive single-lens reflex camera may be expected to have a design life measured in years or decades.

== Long design lives ==
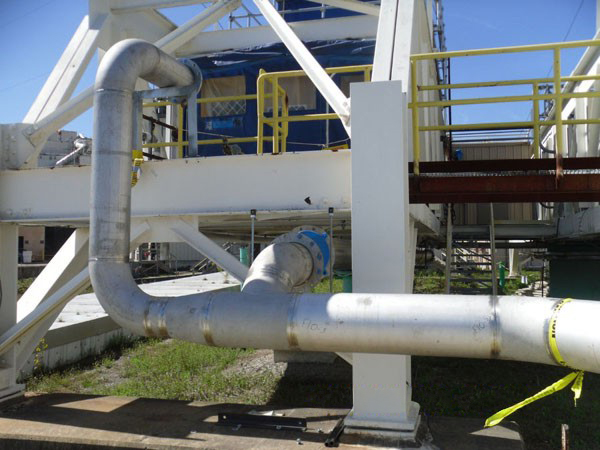
Tank piping with a thirty-year design life

Some products designed for heavy or demanding use are so well-made that they are retained and used well beyond their design life. Some public transport vehicles come into this category, as do a number of artificial satellites and spacecraft. In general, entry-level products—those at the lowest end of the price range fulfilling a certain specification—will tend to have shorter design lives than more expensive products fulfilling the same function, since there are savings to be made in using designs that are cheaper to implement, or, conversely, costs to be passed onto the customer in engineering to provide a safe margin leading to an increased working life. This economic truism leads to the phenomenon of products designed (or appearing to be designed) to last only so long as their warranty period.

== Obsolescence ==
Design life is related to but distinct from the concept of planned obsolescence. The latter is the somewhat more nebulous notion that products are designed so as to become obsolete—at least in the eyes of the user—before the end of their design life. Two classic examples here are digital cameras, which become genuinely obsolete as a result of the very rapid rate of technological advances, although still in perfect working order; and non-digital cameras, which are perceived as obsolete after a year or so as they are no longer "the latest design" although actually capable of years of useful service.

== See also ==
- Availability
- Circular economy
- Disposable product
- Durability
- Interchangeable parts
- Maintainability
- Repairability
- Source reduction
- Throwaway society
- ISO 15686
