= Henry Myles =

Henry Myles may refer to:

- Henry Myles (American football) (1904–1978), American football player
- Henry Myles (cricketer) (1911–1942), South African cricketer
- Henry R. Myles (1824–??), American physician

== See also ==
- Henry Miles (1698–1763), English Dissenting minister and scientific writer
