= Leslie Milnes =

New Zealand cricketer

Les Milnes
Personal information
- Full name: Leslie Albert Milnes
- Born: 3 July 1922; Dunedin, Otago, New Zealand
- Died: 20 March 2013 (aged 90); Motueka, Tasman, New Zealand
- Batting: Right-handed
- Relatives: Glenn Milnes (grandson)

Domestic team information
- Years: Team
- 1944/45–1948/49: Otago
- Source: Cricinfo, 2 April 2021

Leslie Albert Milnes (3 July 1922 – 20 March 2013) was a New Zealand cricketer. He played nine first-class matches between the 1942–43 and 1948–49.

Milnes was born at Dunedin in 1922 and was educated at Otago Boys' High School and King's High School in the city. He played cricket at school and led King's batting averages in 1937–38.

During World War II Milnes served in the New Zealand Army. He played wartime cricket for army sides and made his first-class debut for a South Island Army side against a similar side from the North Island at the Basin Reserve in February 1943. He made scores of 41 and six in the match before going on to play for an army side against one from the New ZealandAir Force later in the year. He had played some wartime cricket for Otago sides during the 1942–43 season, and played the first of seven first-class matches for the province in December 1944. Primarily a right-handed batsman, in his nine first-class matches, Milnes scored 354 runs and took two wickets. He later played Hawke Cup cricket for Nelson between 1954–55 and 1957–58.

Professionally Milnes worked as an accountant. He died at Motueka in the Tasman Region in 2013 aged 90. His grandson Glenn Milnes played six first-class and 21 List A matches for Central Districts during the 1990s as well as playing Hawke Cup cricket for Nelson.
