= Louise Jordan Miln =

American novelist

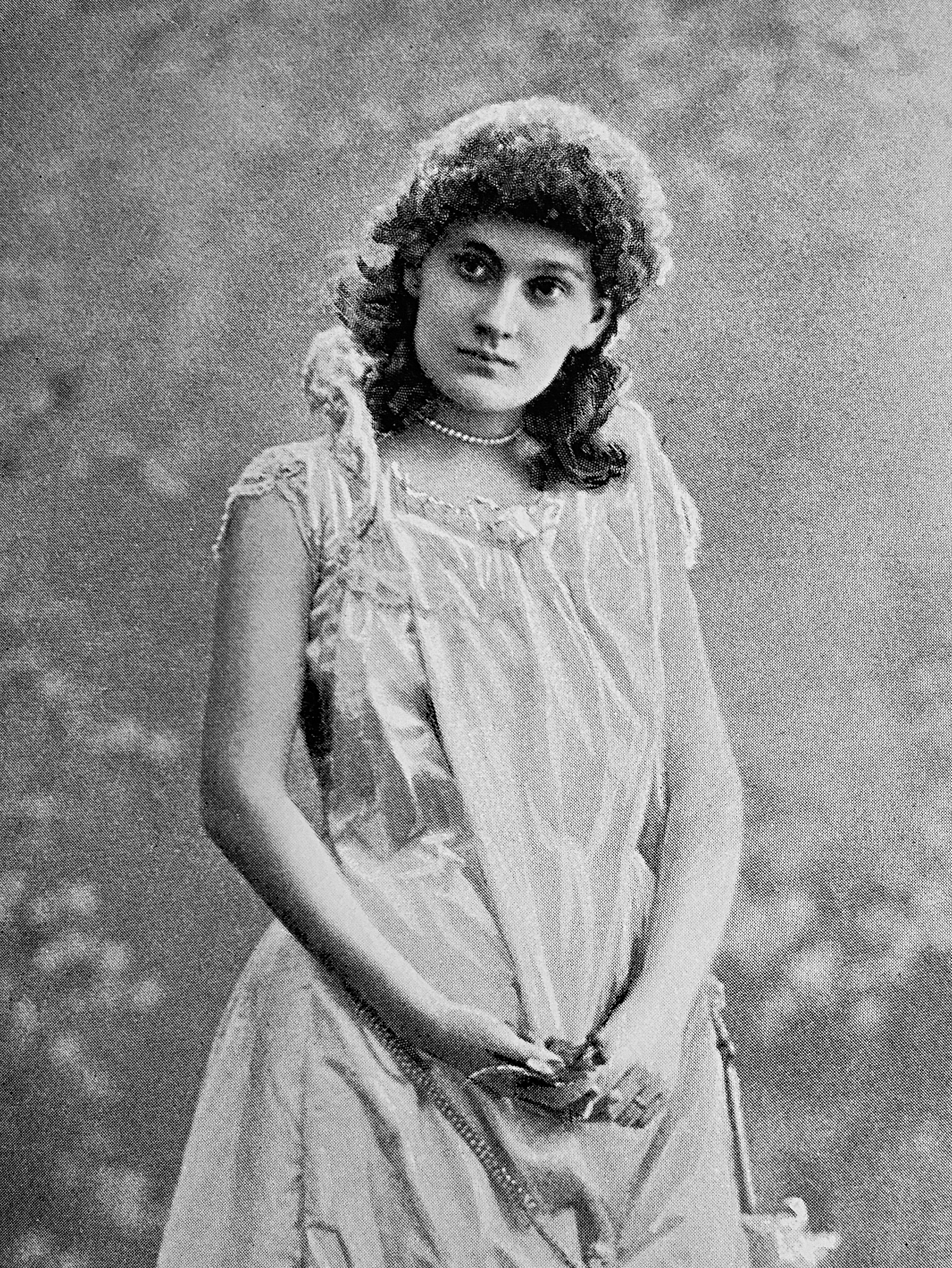
- Born: Louise Jordan; March 5, 1864; Macomb, Illinois
- Died: September 22, 1933 (aged 69); Trepied, France
- Occupation: Writer (novelist)
- Spouse: George Crichton Miln (m. 1888; died 1917)
- Children: 5 Children: 3 sons, 2 daughters; 3 Stepchildren: 2 stepdaughters, 1 stepson
- Writing career
- Period: 19th, 20th century
- Genres: Fiction, travelogue

Louise Jordan Miln (March 5, 1864 – September 22, 1933) was an American actress, writer and novelist.

== Biography ==
Miln was born in Macomb, Illinois to Dr. T. M. Jordan, a local physician and Annie Wells. At age 5 the family moved to Chicago where her father became wealthy as a banker. She attended Vassar College but was forced to withdraw due to ill-health. At age 18, she began to act in plays in a travelling theatrical company which was run by her future husband, George Crichton Miln. She married him in 1888 and together they travelled to Australia. Her husband struggled to work as an actor and their life for a few years was lived in poverty. He eventually left for work in New Zealand leaving her behind in Sydney to take care of their three young children.

After her father died, Miln came in to some income from his estate which allowed them to travel around Asia where they also performed in plays. As a stage actress, Miln and her husband performed Shakespeare in Australia in 1890. Moving through Asia, they continued to perform in Calcutta, Rangoon, Singapore, Shanghai, and Hong Kong. Arriving in Japan in May 1891, the theatre group directed by her husband gave two weeks of Shakespeare performances at the Gaiety Theatre in Yokohama. These performances were the first full-text Shakespeare productions staged in Japan and were influential in the modern development of Japanese theatre.

Her earlier travel experiences in Asia inspired her to start writing which she did with two travel memoirs, When We Were Strolling Players In The East, (1894) and Quaint Korea, (1895). During her time in Japan, she visited with two students she had known at Vassar in 1879, one was Stematz Yamakawa. Stematz (aka Sutematsu) had become the first Japanese woman to earn a college degree in 1882. Stematz had married the Japanese Minister of War by the time of Miln’s visit and had become the Countess Sutematsu Oyama.

In 1896, they moved to London, England where they bought a monthly periodical called The British Realm, which George edited. Louise contributed many articles and continued writing. George died in 1917 and Miln continued her writing career. She completed Mr. Wu in 1918, based on the successful earlier play by H.M. Vernon and Harold Owen. The novel focuses on ancient traditions and the vengeance that, seemingly, must follow the clandestine relationship between a Chinese mandarin's daughter and her young American lover. The book was very popular and it was eventually made into a film starring Lon Chaney. This led to 15 more novels, mainly romances set in China which sold well at the time.

One of her books, The Green Goddess, is based on a play by William Archer about a Shangri-La-type place. Miln’s 1922 novel is set in British controlled India. Captain Anthony Crespin brings his beautiful young bride Lucilla there to continue his military service. The two of them, with their airplane pilot, have an emergency landing in a remote mountainous enclave outside of the control of British regiments. They are held as captives when the ruler of the hidden land falls in love with Lucilla. A silent film The Green Goddess (1923) and a Vitaphone remake The Green Goddess (1930) were released within a decade of the successful play and novel.

She purchased a house in Trepied, France, just across the channel where she died in 1933.

== Works ==
Mr. & Mrs. Sên explores the difficulties a British woman and Chinese man face when they fall in love in Washington D.C. After visiting China together, they decide to make their home in England.

Ruben and Ivy Sên follows the lives of the children of Mr. & Mrs. Sên. Ruben Sên has the physical features of his English mother while he has the "Chinese soul" of his father. Ivy Sên hates her Chinese appearance and heritage with an unforgiving vehemence.

It Happened in Peking is set during the siege in 1900. Trapped British and Americans tourists seek to survive during the conflict between China and the rest of the world. Epigraph: “If you prick us, do we not bleed? If you tickle us, do we not laugh? If you poison us, do we not die? and if you wrong us, shall we not revenge?"

Quaint Korea is a set of reminiscences of the Far East, comparing Korea with its neighbours Japan and China. The descriptions cover architecture, men, women, morals, art, theatre and many other topics. Written to entertain but critical as to common perceptions in the West, including those of other travel writers. It gives descriptions of Queen Min and the daily lives of Korean ladies, concubines, geishas and the poor.

- When We Were Strolling Players In The East, (1894)
- Quaint Korea, (1895)
- An Actor's Wooing: Being The Confessions Of A Chaperon, (1896)
- Little Folk Of Many Lands, (1899)
- Wooings And Weddings In Many Climes, (1900)
- A Woman And Her Talent, (1905)
- The Invisible Foe, (1917)
- Were Man But Constant, (1918)
- Mr Wu, (1918)
- The Purple Mask, (1918)
- The Feast Of Lanterns, (1920)
- The Heart Of A Rose, (c1920)
- The Pursuit of Pamela, (c1921)
- The Green Goddess, (1922)
- Mr And Mrs Sen, (1923)
- In A Shantung Garden, (1924)
- The Soul Of China, (1925)
- Ruby And Ivy Sen, (1925)
- It Happened In Peking, (1926)
- In A Yun-nan Courtyard, (1927)
- Red Lily And Chinese Jade, (1928)
- The Flutes Of Shanghai, (1928)
- By Soochow Waters, (1929)
- Rice, (1930)
- The Vintage Of Yon-Yih (also titled: The Vintage Of Yon Yee), (1931)
- Ann Zu-Zan, A Chinese Love Story (also titled: A Chinese Triangle), (1932)
- Peng Wers Harvest, (1933)
