= Myles Little =

American photographer

Myles Little, a former Time magazine photo editor, is a PhD candidate studying the history of photography at the University of Southern California. He curated the traveling photography exhibit "One Percent: Privilege in a Time of Global Inequality," which travelled to five continents between 2015 and 2018. Both Time and Internazionale named the catalogue as one of the best photo books of 2016.
