= Myles Wright =

English footballer (born 1996)

Personal information
- Full name: Myles Harvey Wright
- Date of birth: 14 September 1996 (age 30)
- Place of birth: Bakewell, England
- Height: 6 ft 4 in (1.93 m)
- Position: Goalkeeper

Team information
- Current team: Alfreton Town

Senior career*
Years	Team	Apps	(Gls)
2014–2016	Chesterfield	1	(0)
2015	→ Bradford Park Avenue (loan)	1	(0)
2016–2017	Buxton		
2017–2018	Shaw Lane		
2018	Gainsborough Trinity		
2018–2021	Staveley Miners Welfare		
2021	Belper Town	7	(0)
2021–2023	Hallam		
2023	Handsworth		
2023	Matlock Town	0	(0)
2023–2024	AFC Mansfield		
2024–2025	Matlock Town	5	(0)
2024	→ Sheffield (dual-registration)	8	(0)
2025–	Alfreton Town	0	(0)
- * Club domestic league appearances and goals as of 15:04, 28 March 2025 (UTC)

Myles Harvey Wright (born 14 September 1996) is an English professional footballer who plays as a goalkeeper for Alfreton Town

== Career ==
Wright made his Football League debut on 4 October 2014, coming on as a 42nd-minute substitute during Chesterfield's 3–2 League One victory against Sheffield United. He replaced Jay O'Shea in a tactical substitution following Tommy Lee's red card.

On 29 August 2015, Wright joined Bradford Park Avenue on an emergency loan. He made his début the same day in the club's 4–4 draw with North Ferriby United. In May 2016, Wright was released by Chesterfield. He joined Buxton following his release.

In June 2022, Wright was confirmed to have joined Hallam.

In March 2025, Wright joined National League North side Alfreton Town.

== Career statistics ==
As of matches played 4 October 2014.

Club statistics
Club	Season	League			FA Cup		League Cup		Other		Total	
Club	Season	Division	Apps	Goals	Apps	Goals	Apps	Goals	Apps	Goals	Apps	Goals
Chesterfield	2014–15	League One	1	0	0	0	0	0	0	0	1	0
Bradford Park Avenue	2015-16	National League North	1	0	0	0	0	0	0	0	1	0
Career total			2	0	0	0	0	0	0	0	2	0
