= Cava Group =

Greek-American restaurant chain

Cava Group, Inc.
- Type: Public
- Traded as: NYSE: CAVA; S&P 400 component
- Industry: Restaurants
- Genre: Fast Casual
- Founded: 2006; 20 years ago (as Cava Mezze) in Rockville, Maryland, U.S.
- Founders: Ted Xenohristos; Ike Grigoropoulos; Dimitri Moshovitis; Brett Schulman
- Headquarters: Washington, D.C., U.S.
- Number of locations: 474 (2026)
- Area served: United States
- Key people: Ted Xenohristos (Chief Concept Officer); Brett Schulman (CEO)
- Revenue: ▲US$1.18 billion (2025)
- Net income: ▼US$63.7 million (2025)
- Number of employees: c. 11,000 (2024)
- Website: cava.com

Cava (stylized in all caps as CAVA) is an American Mediterranean fast casual restaurant chain with locations across the United States. Cava is owned by the publicly traded Cava Group, which purchased Zoës Kitchen in August 2018. The combined company is the largest restaurant operator in the Mediterranean category in the U.S. restaurant industry. Cava also produces a line of Mediterranean cava dips, spreads, and dressings that are sold in grocery stores across the US. As of May 2023, all Zoës Kitchen restaurants have been closed or replaced by Cava restaurants.

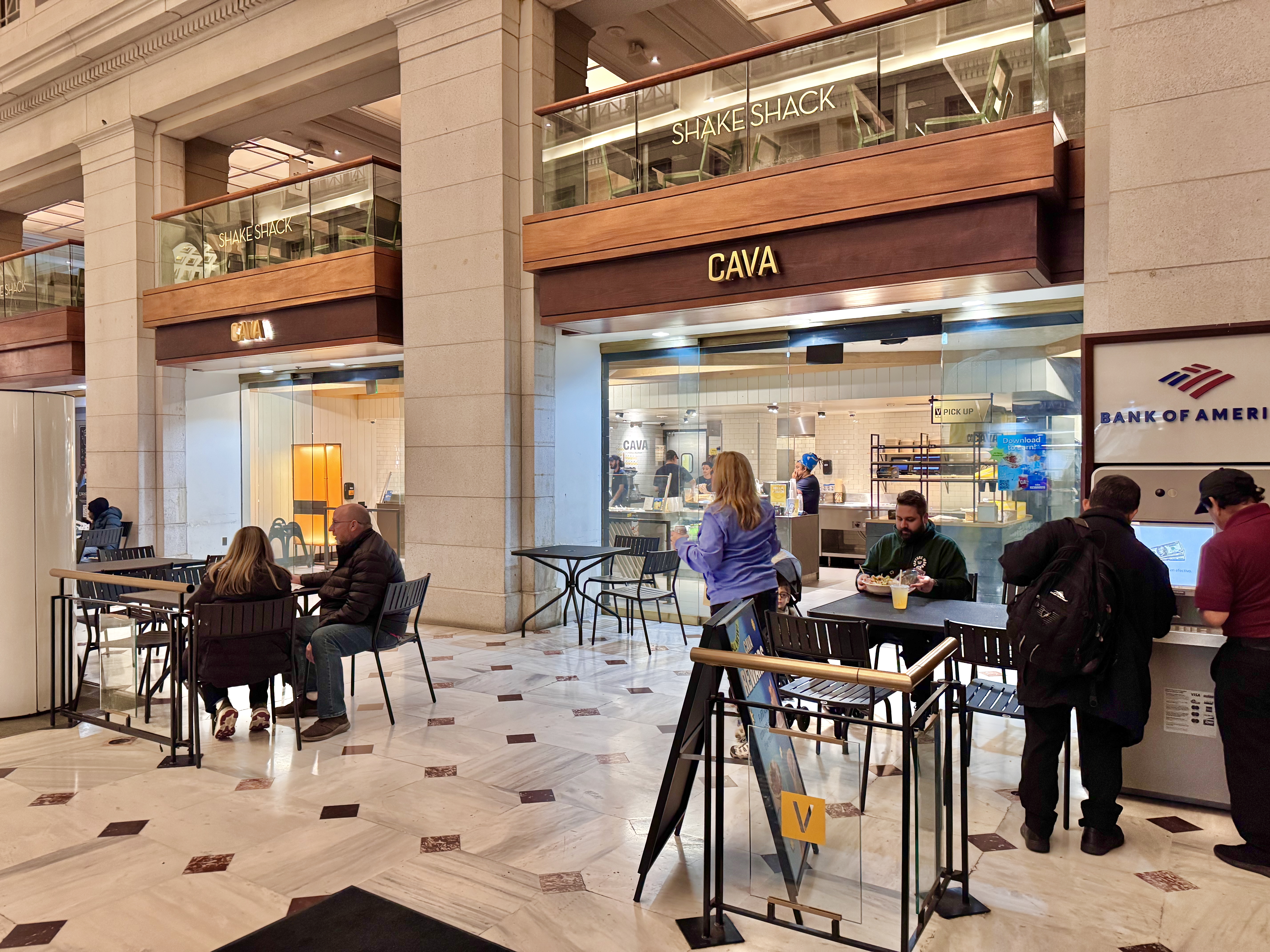
Cava restaurant in Washington D.C.'s Union Station

== History ==
In 2006, first-generation Greek Americans Ted Xenohristos, Ike Grigoropoulos, and Dimitri Moshovitis launched the full-service Cava Mezze restaurant in Rockville, Maryland, with Moshovitis as executive chef. In 2008, Xenohristos, Grigoropoulos, and Moshovitis partnered with Geoff Maites and Kenny Maites to launch a line of dips and spreads, and grew the product line into over 200 stores, including Whole Foods Market. In 2009, Brett Schulman joined them as CEO and co-founder of the fast-casual chain Cava (originally called Cava Mezze Grill, later rebranded as Cava Grill and then simply as Cava). They opened the first Cava restaurant in Bethesda, Maryland, in January 2011.

In August 2018, Zoës was acquired by Cava Group, Inc. for $300 million in total enterprise value.

In April 2021, Cava Group completed a $190 million series F funding round led by T. Rowe Price, bringing its value to nearly $1.3 billion. Since 2015, the company has raised more than $640 million.

By December 2022, the Cava Group had significantly reduced the number of Zoe's Kitchen locations. As of May 2023, all Zoe's Kitchen restaurants had closed, and many had been replaced by Cava restaurants.

On June 15, 2023, Cava made its public debut on the NYSE under the symbol CAVA.

== Restaurants and expansion ==
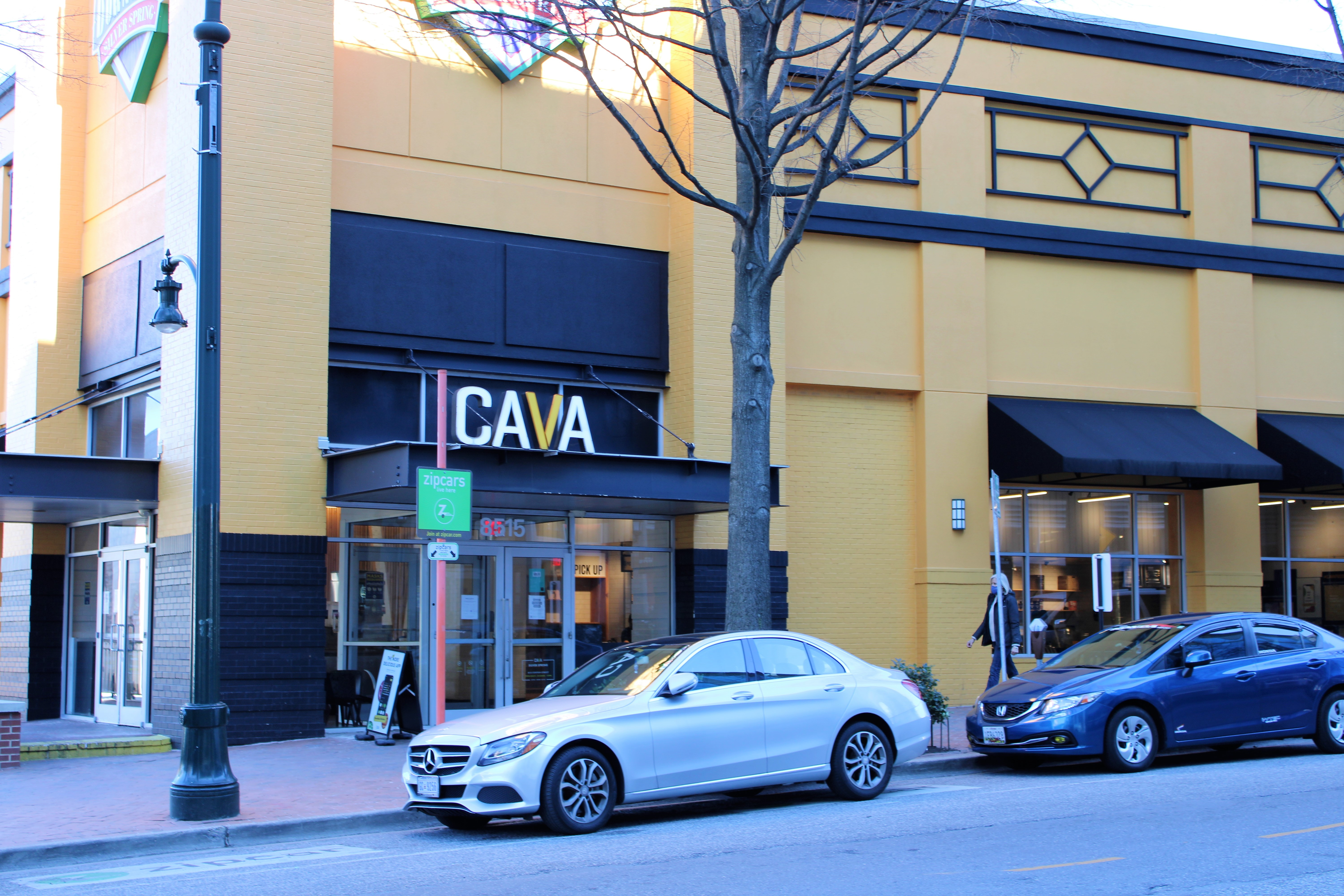
Cava restaurant in Silver Spring, Maryland

In November 2018, Cava Group bought Zoës Kitchen, a restaurant chain with more than 250 locations, in a deal worth $300 million, taking the company private and helping Cava expand further into the suburbs.

As of August 2021, there were 133 Cava locations. All Cava restaurants are company-owned, and none are franchised. In 2020, Cava Group converted seven of its Zoës Kitchen locations to Cava-branded restaurants, with plans to convert 50 more in 2021. It has additional off-premises and digital kitchens dedicated to preparing food for online orders. As of May 2026, Cava operated 474 restaurant locations in the United States.
