= Mile, Jajce =

Mile
- Village
- Location within Bosnia and Herzegovina
- Coordinates: 44.3592698°N 17.2171847°E
- Country: Bosnia and Herzegovina
- Entity: Federation of Bosnia and Herzegovina
- Canton: Central Bosnia
- Municipality: Jajce

Area
  - Total: 4.51 sq mi (11.67 km^{2})

Population (2013)
  - Total: 1,056
  - Density: 234.4/sq mi (90.49/km^{2})
- Time zone: UTC+1 (CET)
  - Summer (DST): UTC+2 (CEST)

Mile is a village in the municipality of Jajce, Bosnia and Herzegovina.

== Demographics ==
According to the 2013 census, its population was 1,056.

Ethnicity in 2013
Ethnicity	Number	Percentage
Croats	1,038	98.3%
Serbs	4	0.4%
other/undeclared	14	1.3%
Total	1,056	100%
