= Country Mile (Ernie Smith album) =

Studio album by Ernie Smith
- Released: 2008
- Genre: Reggae
- Language: English

Country Mile is a 2008 studio album by Jamaican singer Ernie Smith, his 20th studio album in a career spanning four decades. The album contains mainly original compositions. Prior to the release of the album the track "That's The Kinda People We Are", a duet with Pluto Shervington, was released as a single.

== Track listing ==
1. "You Are a Lion" with Ron Muschette
2. "Country Mile"
3. "Trouble Trouble"
4. "That's the Kind of People We Are" with Pluto Shervington
5. "Zion Bound"
6. "Somebody Here"
7. "One Man the Same Man"
8. "Kin Kat Pupalick"
9. "Jam Dung We Deh" with Pluto Shervington
10. "Deadly Night in Kingston"
11. "Coming Back from the Floor"
12. "Break Away"
13. "Alone Again"
14. "Longfellow Serenade"
15. "Heal Jamaica" with Anthony B, Leroy Sibbles, Pam Hall etc.
