= Myles Chefetz =

American restaurateur and chief executive officer (born 1958)

- Born: Myles Alan Chefetz; November 5, 1958 (age 67); Miami, Florida, U.S.
- Education: George Washington University (BA); University of Miami (JD)

Myles Alan Chefetz (born November 5, 1958) is an American restaurateur and chief executive officer of Myles Restaurant Group. He has been twice nominated for the James Beard Foundation "Outstanding Restaurateur" Award and has been referred to as the "Sultan of South of Fifth."

Prime 112, Chefetz's steakhouse, is consistently ranked in the top ten highest-grossing restaurants in the United States.

== Early life and education ==
Chefetz was born on the Homestead Air Reserve Base in Miami, Florida to parents Marshall Chefetz and Jean Wyman.

Along with his older brother Gary and younger sister Karen, Chefetz grew up in Allentown, Pennsylvania and Springfield, New Jersey. Chefetz attended Jonathan Dayton High School before graduating from George Washington University with a degree in political science. Chefetz earned a J.D. from the University of Miami in 1984.

== Career ==
After finishing law school, Chefetz moved to New York City, where he started his own real estate law practice. Chefetz became personal lawyer to Mark Fleischman, former owner of the nightclub Studio 54. It was during his time with Fleischman that Chefetz got his first introduction to the supper club business. Chefetz handled the lease negotiations for the property and contracts with club promoters, and began promoting parties himself. By age 30, Chefetz left his law practice and opened Country Club, a 15,000-square-foot (1,400 m^{2}) nightclub on 86th Street on the Upper East Side.

During a 1994 vacation to Miami, Chefetz found himself disappointed with the dining scene in South Beach. He opened Nemo in 1995, wanting to establish a chef-driven, rather than promoter-driven, restaurant. Chefetz sold his properties in New York and moved to Miami full-time. Chefetz continued to work in the South Beach dining scene, opening the modern diner Big Pink in 1996. In 2004, Chefetz opened Prime 112 in the Browns Hotel.

Chefetz has parlayed his restaurant endeavors into numerous real estate ventures. In 2013, he sold his penthouse at South Beach's Ocean House to Marc J. Leder for $15 million ($3,592 per square foot) in an all-cash deal.

== Restaurants and hotel ==
Miami Beach:

- Big Pink – opened December 1996
- Prime One Twelve – opened January 2004
- Prime Italian – opened December 2008
- Prime Hotel – opened January 2010
- Prime Private – opened early 2019, 200-seat capacity

Closed:

- Nemo – January 1995
- Shoji
- Prime Fish - April 2026

== Personal life ==
Chefetz and his longtime girlfriend Natasha have one daughter, Mylie Danielle Chefetz.
