= Alonzo L. Miles =

American politician and lawyer (1864–1917)

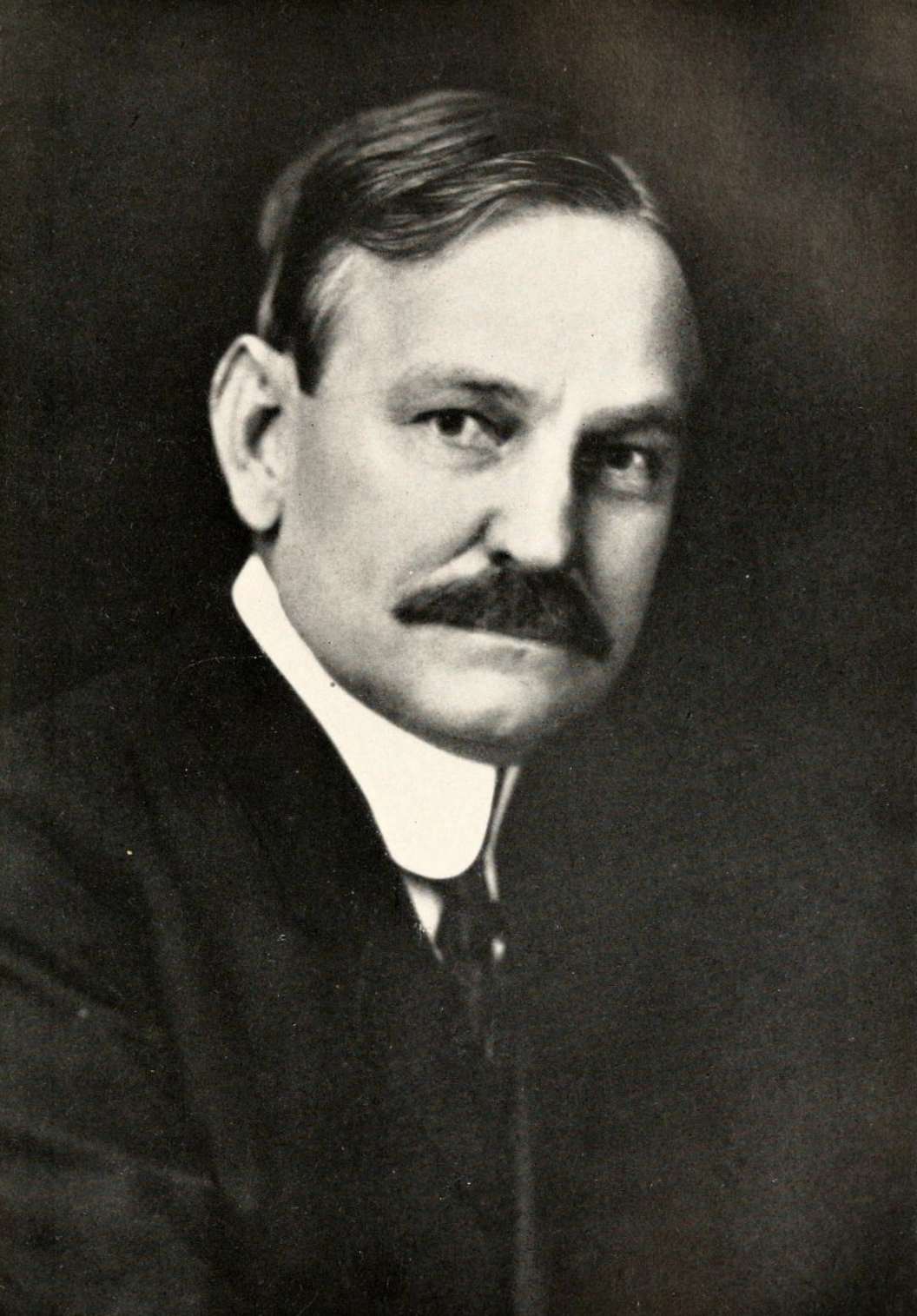
- Miles in 1912 publication

Member of the Maryland House of Delegates
- In office 1892, 1898

Personal details
- Born: February 3, 1864 Somerset County, Maryland, U.S.
- Died: November 3, 1917 (aged 53) Salisbury, Maryland, U.S.
- Resting place: Cambridge, Maryland, U.S.
- Party: Democratic
- Spouse: Agnes Hooper (m. 1891)
- Children: 4, including Hooper S.
- Relatives: Joshua Weldon Miles (brother)
- Education: Western Maryland College; University of Maryland School of Law
- Occupation: Politician; lawyer
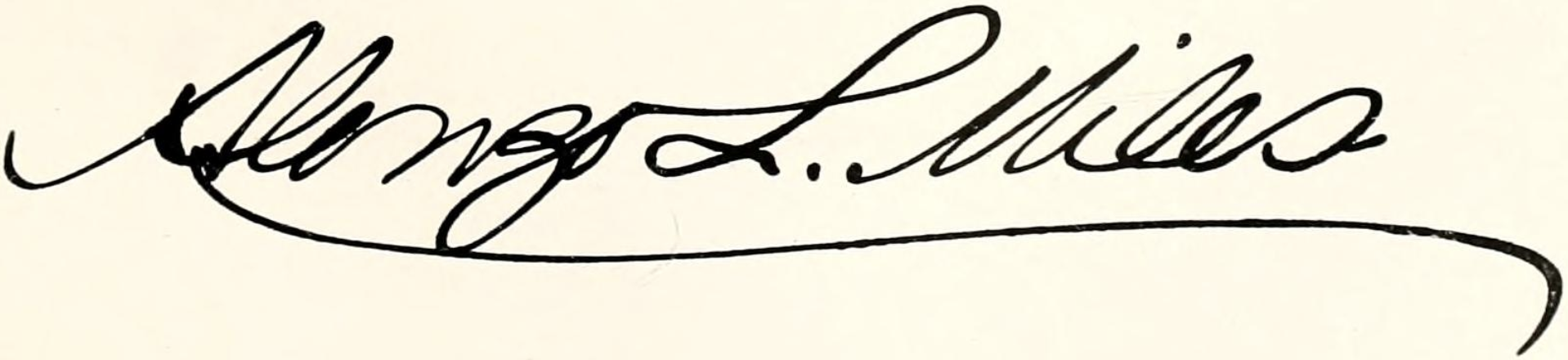
- Signature

Alonzo L. Miles (February 3, 1864 – November 3, 1917) was an American politician and lawyer from Maryland. He served as a member of the Maryland House of Delegates, representing Dorchester County, in 1892 and 1898.

== Early life ==
Alonzo L. Miles was born on February 3, 1864, on the family farm in Somerset County, Maryland, to Christina (née Roach) and Southey F. Miles. His father was sheriff of Somerset County for a time. He graduated Western Maryland College (later McDaniel College). His brother was Joshua Weldon Miles, who served as a U.S. Representative of Maryland. He later graduated from the University of Maryland School of Law. He was admitted to the bar in Princess Anne in 1885.

== Career ==
Miles was appointed as collector of the port at Crisfield, replacing his father, during Grover Cleveland's first term. He resigned prior to President Harrison's administration. Miles practiced law in Princess Anne, then he removed to Cambridge, Maryland, to practice law there.

Miles was a Democrat. Miles served as a member of the Maryland House of Delegates, representing Dorchester County, in 1892 and 1898. He served as presidential elector-at-large from Maryland in 1892.

After serving in the House of Delegates, in May 1898, Miles moved to Baltimore. He formed a law practice with Arthur Pue Gorman Jr. and John T. Morris. He was named counsel to the police board by Governor John Walter Smith in 1900. He was re-appointed as counsel by Governors Warfield and Crothers. In 1906, the law firm Miles & Gorman was dissolved and Miles practiced alone.

== Personal life ==
Miles married Agnes Hooper on February 13, 1891, at Christ Church in Cambridge. His wife was distantly related to Governor Phillips Goldsbourough and great-niece of Isaac Nevett Steele. They had three sons and one daughter, Alonzo L. Jr., Hooper S., Clarence W. and Nesta Louise. His son Hooper S. served as a member of the Maryland House of Delegates.

Miles died on November 3, 1917, at his home in Salisbury. He was buried in Cambridge.
