= Lawrence D. Miles =

Lawrence Delos Miles (April 21, 1904 Harvard, Nebraska – August 1, 1985) was an American engineer, and the creator of Value engineering. His parents were Delos Daniel Miles, Superintendent of Harvard School, and Vinetta Conkle Miles, an elementary school teacher.

== Life and work ==
1932-1938: Worked as a design engineer at General Electric (GE) under W .C. White, Manager of the Vacuum Tube Engineering Dept. During this six year periods, he earned twelve patents for his new designs of vacuum tubes and related circuits.

1938-1944: Transferred to GE's Purchasing Department, working under Harry Erlicher, VP Purchasing. Worked with vendors to obtain lower costs, then with change of emphasis to procure adequate quantities for the war effort.

1944-1947: Transferred to Locke Insulator, Baltimore, Maryland, a subsidiary of GE, as manager of Purchasing. Saw first-hand both the productive and destructive force of human attitudes and practices, and their effect on appropriate designs and appropriate costs.

Fall 1947: Returned to Schenectady, New York, to Erlicher's staff and was placed under William Sredenscheck who gave him full support to produce an approach for GE to improve cost and productivity.

In December 1947, the basic Value Analysis Functional Approach was established.

1961 - Miles wrote the definitive book, Techniques of Value Analysis and Engineering, published by McGraw Hill and Co. It is now in its 3rd edition and is printed in twelve languages. He retired in 1964 and died in 1985. His wife, Eleanor R. Miles, survived him and continued to promote his work after his death.

== Laurence Delos Miles Value Foundation ==
The Miles Value Foundation was established in 1977 "to promote and fund the development of educational programs, new applications, and [to establish] a research library for the study of the Value Methodology".
