= Rufus Miles =

American government administrator and author

- Born: Rufus Edward Miles, Jr. June 14, 1910; Cincinnati, Ohio
- Died: April 9, 1996 (aged 85); Ithaca, New York
- Occupation: Government administrator
- Known for: Miles' Law
- Spouse: Nelle Mary Petrouski (m. 1938; died 1988)

Rufus Edward Miles, Jr. (June 14, 1910 – April 9, 1996) was an American government administrator and author. He held administrative positions at the Federal Security Agency and the Department of Health, Education, and Welfare (H.E.W.) for fifteen years. He also served as an assistant secretary to three United States Presidents: Dwight D. Eisenhower, John F. Kennedy, and Lyndon B. Johnson. After his retirement in 1965, he wrote several books, including The Department of Health Education and Welfare (1974), a history of H.E.W., and Awakening From the American Dream: The Social and Political Consequences of Growth (1976), which argued that rapid economic growth was not sustainable over the long term. The latter book was a runner-up for the 1977 National Book Award.

== Miles' Law ==
Miles is the originator and namesake of the aphorism Miles' Law, which states, "Where you stand depends on where you sit." The phrase originated in remarks Miles made in late 1948 and early 1949 while working as chief of the labor and welfare branch of the Bureau of the Budget.
