= Devil's Train =

Studio album by Eric Sardinas
- Released: August 28, 2001
- Genre: Blues
- Length: 51:07
- Label: Evidence music
- Producer: David Honeyboy Edwards & Neil Citron & Eric Sardinas

Professional ratings
Review scores
Source	Rating
Allmusic	3.5/5.0 stars
The Penguin Guide to Blues Recordings	2.5/4 stars

Devil's Train is the second album released by Eric Sardinas.

== Track listing ==
1. "Piece of Me" (Sardinas) – 3:04
2. "My Sweet Time" (Sardinas) – 4:13
3. "Texola" (Sardinas) – 3:35
4. "Aggravatin' Papa (Sardinas) – 3:54
5. "Killin' Time Blues (Sardinas) – 4:24
6. "My Kind of Woman (James, Sehorn) – 4:36
7. "Country Mile" (Sardinas) – 4:06
8. "Gambling Man Blues" (Edwards) – 5:04
9. "Down to Whiskey" (Sardinas) – 3:01
10. "Devil's Train" (Sardinas) – 2:59
11. "Be Your Man" (Sardinas) – 3:26
12. "Sidewinder" (Sardinas) – 5:48
13. "8 Goin' South" (Sardinas) – 4:01
