= David Myles =

David Myles may refer to:

- David Myles (Scottish politician) (1925–2018), Scottish Conservative Party politician, MP (1979–1983)
- David Myles (rugby league) (born 1978), Australian rugby league player
- David Myles (musician) (born 1981), Canadian musician and Liberal Party politician, MP (2025-) from Fredericton, New Brunswick

== See also ==
- David Miles (disambiguation)
