= Robert Milnes =

Robert Milnes may refer to:

- Sir Robert Milnes, 1st Baronet (1754–1837), British colonial governor
- Robert Pemberton Milnes (1784–1858), British landowner and politician
- Robert Crewe-Milnes, 1st Marquess of Crewe (1858–1945), British Liberal politician, grandson of the above
