= William Milnes Marsden =

William Henry Milnes Marsden MBE (1873–1956) was a British solicitor and philatelist who was added to the Roll of Distinguished Philatelists in 1947. He was a justice of the peace.

Milnes Marsden was an expert in the philately of Bosnia, for which he won awards. He contributed on that subject to the Kohl Briefmarken-Handbuch. He was a vice-president of the Royal Philatelic Society London.

He was the son of W. H. Marsden J.P. of Derby, and was educated at Repton School.
