= Lynda Myles =

Lynda Myles may refer to:

- Lynda Myles (British producer) (born 1947), British writer and producer
- Lynda Myles (American writer) (born 1939), American writer and actress
