= Treat Me Right (album) =

Studio album by Eric Sardinas
- Released: February 23, 1999
- Genre: Blues
- Label: Evidence Music

Treat Me Right is the first album released by Florida bluesman Eric Sardinas. It is noted for its use of traditional recording techniques with each song being recorded in one take without any kind of digital editing, which follows Sardinas's motto "respect tradition" which he had tattooed on his back.

== Critical reception ==
The Toronto Star advised: "Don't be misled by his slow-talk intros, for this blues bad-boy soon delivers WWF-calibre guitar slams that sound like Johnny Winter on speed."

== Track listing ==
All tracks are written by Eric Sardinas, except where noted

1. "Treat Me Right"
2. "Write Me a Few Lines" (Fred McDowell)
3. "Murdering Blues" (Peter "Doc" Clayton)
4. "Cherry Bomb"
5. "My Baby's Got Something" (Bernard Besman, John Lee Hooker)
6. "Give Me Love"
7. "Rollin' and Tumblin'" (Hambone Willie Newbern)
8. "Low Down Love"
9. "Get Along Rider"
10. "Goin' to the River"
11. "I Can't Be Satisfied" (McKinley Morganfield)
12. "Sweetwater Blues"
13. "Down in the Bottom" (Willie Dixon)
14. "Tired of Tryin'" (Johnny Winter)
