= Myles Landick =

Jersey rugby union player

- Born: 1989 (age 36–37) Jersey
- Weight: 10 st 7 lb (117 kg)
- Occupation: Part time Groundsman

Rugby union career
- Position: Prop
- Current team: Jersey
Youth career
- -2007: Les Quennevais
Senior career
Years	Team	Apps	(Points)
2007-	Jersey		

Myles Landick (born 1989) is a rugby union player from Jersey. He plays as a prop for RFU Championship team, Jersey, and is also employed as the groundsman of St. Peter, the ground on which Jersey plays.

== Rugby career ==
A former player for Les Quennevais RFC, Landick moved to play for Jersey's first team after playing for Jersey's youth team, where he was part of the Jersey Academy team that won the Hampshire Rugby Football Union U18 Cup in 2007. Landick made his debut for Jersey in 2010 in their annual Siam Cup game against Guernsey RFC. He later played in Jersey's National League 3 London & SE play-off Final at Twickenham Stadium in London, England. In March 2012, he was forced to miss the remainder of Jersey's league games in National League 1 after injuring a ligament in his knee whilst training. In May 2012, he was named by coach Ben Harvey as one of Jersey's academy players that had been brought through to play in the first team. In 2013, it was announced that Landick was one of nine Jersey players who had been offered extended contracts to remain at Jersey for the 2013-14 RFU Championship season.

After a shoulder injury in 2010 prevented him from playing, he spent some time coaching his former club Les Quennevais R.F.C.

== Employment ==
Landick started working at Jersey Airport whilst playing rugby for Jersey. He was then offered the job as groundsman of Jersey. He accepted and worked on the pitches at St. Peter while also playing rugby for Jersey. According to Landick, this may mean that he is the only first team player who is also the groundsman of the team for which he plays.
