= Henry Myles (American football) =

American football player (1904–1978)

Personal information
- Born: September 1, 1904; Lewisburg, West Virginia
- Died: November 30, 1978 (aged 74); Orange Park, Florida
- Listed height: 6 ft 0 in (1.83 m)
- Listed weight: 190 lb (86 kg)

Career history
- Buffalo Bisons (1929); Newark Tornadoes (1930)

Henry Seig Myles (September 1, 1904 – November 30, 1978) was an American professional football player who spent two seasons in the National Football League with the Buffalo Bisons in 1929 and the Newark Tornadoes in 1930.
