= Zoës Kitchen =

Former American restaurant chain specializing in made-from-scratch foods

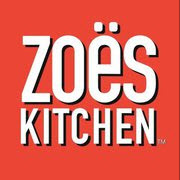

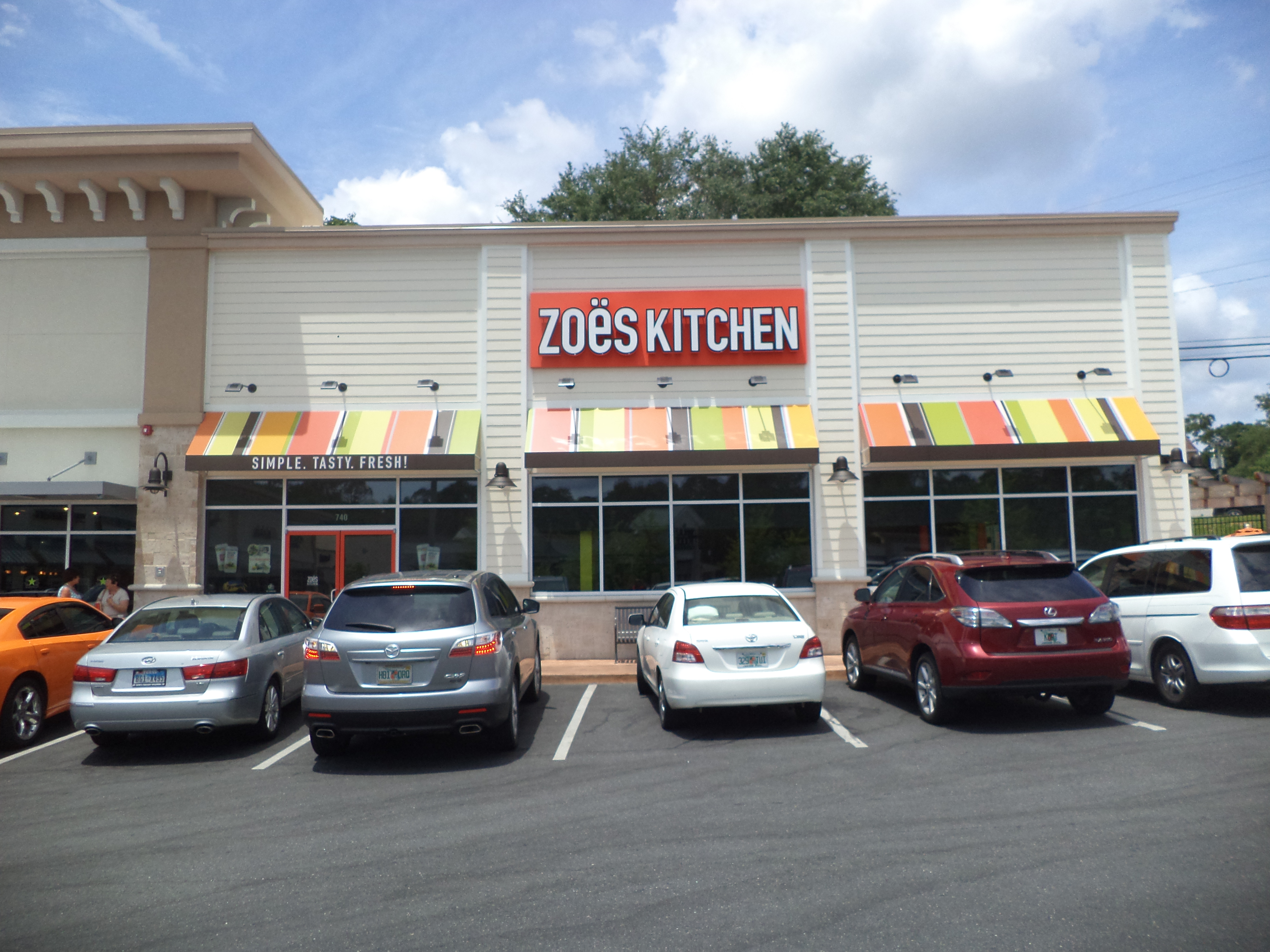
- A Zoës Kitchen restaurant in Tallahassee, Florida
- Type: Subsidiary
- Industry: Restaurants
- Genre: Fast Casual
- Founded: June 1995; 31 years ago (as Zoe's Kitchen, Inc.); Homewood, Alabama, U.S.
- Founder: Marcus Cassimus; Zoë Cassimus
- Defunct: May 27, 2023; 3 years ago
- Fate: Acquired by Cava Group
- Successor: Cava
- Headquarters: United States
- Area served: United States
- Products: Sandwiches; Pitas; Salads; Soups; Kabobs; Other food products
- Parent: Cava Group
- Website: www.cava.com

Zoës Kitchen was a Mediterranean Style restaurant chain, and a subsidiary of the Cava Group. Their headquarters were located in Plano, Texas. In 2013, the chain had grown to host over 200 locations across 17 states; however, acquisition by Cava Group resulted in a reduction of Zoe's locations (some replaced by Cava restaurants).

== History ==
Zoës Kitchen was originally based in Homewood, Alabama, as "Zoe's Kitchen Inc". It was founded in June 1995 by Zoë and Marcus Cassimus. Initially, the restaurants were not franchised, and Cassimus retained a 51% ownership stake in all subsequently opened locations.

The first location opened in October 1995 in downtown Homewood. A second location opened in the Riverchase section of Hoover in 1999, and a third in downtown Birmingham in March 2001. The restaurant continued expansion with the opening of its first store outside the Birmingham area, with a Tuscaloosa store opening in May 2001 and the first out of state location, Nashville, Tennessee, opening in the fall of 2001. By 2006, Zoës operated sixteen restaurants, eight located in Alabama and others located in Phoenix, Nashville, Memphis, Baton Rouge and Destin.

With 20 stores in operation by 2007, Cassimus sold a majority ownership stake to Brentwood Associates of Los Angeles. Following the purchase, Cassimus announced that he would remain as Chief Executive Officer. The company was still headquartered in Birmingham, and the menu was not affected. Additionally, it was revealed that the sale would potentially result in the opening of 200 new franchises over the next five years.

In Spring 2008, GE Capital Solutions loaned the company ten million dollars which allowed for the development of 50 new stores across the southeast and southwest.

In November 2008, Cassimus resigned, and Greg Dollarhyde, the former CEO of Baja Fresh, replaced him. Dollarhyde announced that he would be looking to expand the restaurant to new locations, with two-thirds remaining company owned and the remainder being franchised.

Zoës launched an online ordering service in 2011, and a mobile app in 2013.

Miles promised that the company would remain headquartered in Birmingham in 2011. However, when the company announced that it would be publicly traded in 2014, SEC filings showed the headquarters as Plano, Texas. Reasons given for the shift included simplifying travel, a lack of talent available in Birmingham, and the need to consolidate offices to prepare for an IPO.

In August 2018, Zoës was acquired by Cava Group, Inc. for $300 million, having offered $12.50 for each outstanding share. Cava Group is a publicly traded company under the ticker CAVA.

On September 24, 2018, American Airlines announced that Zoe's Kitchen will be the primary food partner to serve the light snack and food items in their aircraft's main cabin seats.

In January 2023, Zoës closed their Crestline Village location in Mountain Brook, which made the downtown Birmingham location the last remaining Zoës in the Birmingham metro area. Two Birmingham locations were converted into CAVA franchises, including the original Homewood location. Shortly after the closure of the Crestline location, Cassimus announced that his family, in partnership with the Cava Group, would be taking over the Crestline location to bring back the original Zoës menu from 1995.

As of November, 2026, there is one Zoe’s Kitchen left, in Louisville, KY.
