= Miles, Virginia =

Unincorporated community in Virginia, United States

- Unincorporated community
- Location within Virginia Location within the United States
- Coordinates: 37°24′33″N 76°21′46″W
- Country: United States
- State: Virginia
- County: Mathews
- Elevation: 13 ft (4.0 m)
- Time zone: UTC-5 (Eastern (EST))
  - Summer (DST): UTC-4 (EDT)
- ZIP code: 23025
- Area code: 804
- GNIS feature ID: 1470461

Miles (also known as Miles Store) is an unincorporated community in Mathews County, Virginia, United States. Miles is located on Whites Neck, 3 miles (4.8 km) southwest of Mathews. Miles had a post office, which closed on July 4, 1992.
