= Myles O'Reilly =

Myles O'Reilly may refer to:

- Miles O'Reilly, pseudonym of Irish-American journalist Charles G. Halpine (1829–1868)
- Myles O'Reilly (politician) (1825–1880), Irish soldier, MP and publicist
- Myles O'Reilly (musician) (born 1973), Irish musician
