= Anthony Myles =

Anthony Myles may refer to:

- Anthony Myles (basketball, born 1982), American basketball player
- Anthony Myles (basketball, born 1992), American basketball player
