= Hooper S. Miles =

American politician and lawyer (1895–1964)

Treasurer of Maryland
- In office 1935–1963
- Governor: Harry Nice; Herbert O'Conor; William Preston Lane Jr. Theodore McKeldin; J. Millard Tawes
- Preceded by: John M. Dennis
- Succeeded by: John Luetkemeyer

Member of the Maryland House of Delegates
- In office 1925

Personal details
- Born: Hooper Steele Miles; January 27, 1895 Cambridge, Maryland, U.S.
- Died: March 8, 1964 (aged 69) Baltimore, Maryland, U.S.
- Resting place: Druid Ridge Cemetery; Pikesville, Maryland, U.S.
- Party: Democratic
- Spouse: A. Frances Williams (m. 1919)
- Children: 3
- Parent: Alonzo L. Miles (father)
- Education: University of Maryland School of Law
- Occupation: Politician; lawyer; banker

Hooper Steele Miles (January 27, 1895 – March 8, 1964) was an American politician, lawyer and banker from Maryland. He served as a member of the Maryland House of Delegates, representing Wicomico County, in 1925. He served as Treasurer of Maryland from 1935 to 1963.

== Early life ==
Hooper Steele Miles was born on January 27, 1895, in Cambridge, Maryland, to Agnes (née Hooper) and Alonzo L. Miles. Shortly after his birth, the family moved to Baltimore and he attended public schools there. In 1913, the family moved to Salisbury, Maryland. He graduated from the University of Maryland School of Law in 1916. He was admitted to the bar in 1916.

== Career ==
In 1916, Miles began practicing law with his father in Salisbury under the law firm Miles and Miles. After his father's death in 1917, he practiced alone until forming the law firm Miles, Baily & Williams. He also formed the firm Miles, Whealton & Miles. He formed this partnership with Clarence W. Whealton and his brother Clarence W. Miles. He continued as a lawyer in Salisbury until 1937.

Miles was a Democrat. Miles served in the Maryland House of Delegates, representing Wicomico County, in 1920. He was a delegate to the 1920 Democratic National Convention. In 1925, Miles was elected city solicitor of Salisbury and remained in that role until 1932. In 1931, he was a member of the state banking commission. He served as Treasurer of Maryland from 1935 to 1963.

Miles was president of the Eastern Shore Trust Company of Dorchester County from 1932 to 1937. The bank would reorganize as the County Trust Company of Maryland and would later become the Maryland National Bank of Baltimore. He served as director and executive vice president from 1937 to 1948. In 1948, Miles became chairman of the board and chief executive officer. He also served as director of the executive committee of U.S. Fidelity and Guaranty Company, Eutaw Savings Bank and the Maryland Shipbuilding and Drydock Company.

Miles published The Maryland Executive Budgeting System, 1916–1941 in 1942. Miles was a trustee of the Sheppard and Enoch Pratt Hospital and the Roland Park Country School. He served as treasurer of Johns Hopkins Hospital and vice president of the Baltimore Chamber of Commerce. He was a member of the American and Maryland Bankers Associations and the Association of Reserve City Banks.

== Personal life ==
Miles married A. Frances Williams, daughter of L. Ernest Williams, on February 20, 1919. They had three children, Hooper Steele, Mary Frances and Catherine Louise.

Miles died on March 8, 1964, at Johns Hopkins Hospital in Baltimore. He was buried at Druid Ridge Cemetery in Pikesville.
