= George C. Miln =

American actor

George Crichton Miln (1850–1917) was an American actor and stage manager who was active in Australia 1888–1890.

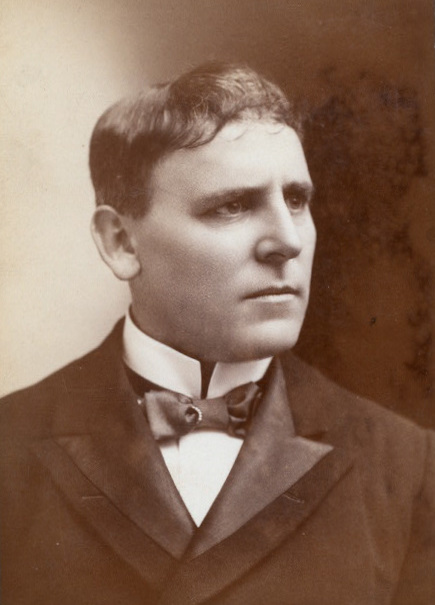
George C. Miln

== History ==
Miln claimed to have been born in England and attended Christ's Hospital Bluecoat School, moved to America and was further educated at Princeton University. The historian Eric Irvin was doubtful about some details on his biography. Miln was a master of the tall tale, witness the note he sent to one Colonel J. S. Wilson, to whom he had given a large dog.

He first came to public attention in 1882 when he left his position in Chicago as a Unitarian pastor, for the uncertain life of a Shakespearean actor.

He first appeared on the Australian stage for George Rignold at Her Majesty's Theatre, Sydney playing a somewhat unconventional Hamlet on 6 October 1888 with his wife, Louise Jordan, as Ophelia and a local supporting cast. This was followed by a vehement Richelieu and thoughtful Richard III with Jordan as Lady Ann. The originality of his interpretations brought a great deal of interest to the theatre though scorned by purists. The company moved to Brisbane, playing, amongst other works, Damon and Pythias at the Opera House with Miln and F. C. Appleton in the name parts, followed by the Victoria Theatre, Newcastle where they finished with Tom Taylor's The Fool's Revenge. They returned to Sydney, this time playing at the Opera House, then on to Melbourne for a short season, Launceston and Hobart and back to Melbourne, followed by the major towns in Victoria. In May 1890 he pleaded insolvency as a result of losses incurred playing Shakespeare in Melbourne and Ballarat. They finished their tour with nine nights in Adelaide, where amongst others, he played Othello to the evident approval of theatregoers, such that he must have regretted not bringing it out (or playing Adelaide) earlier. They left for India by the SS Valetta on 29 October 1890.

The theatre company Miln directed consisted of "twenty odd artists (more or less)." Miln and his group moved on to perform Shakespeare in Calcutta, Rangoon, Singapore, Shanghai, and Hong Kong before reaching Nagasaki in May 1891. Miln's productions of Hamlet, The Merchant of Venice, Romeo and Juliet, Macbeth, Othello, Julius Caesar and Richard III at the Gaiety Theatre in Yokohama were "the first Shakespeare productions staged in complete texts in Japan." The Japanese writer Kitamura Tokoku and the "founder of modern Japanese Theatre" Tsubouchi Shōyō were members of the audience and Miln's performances were influential in shaping modern Japanese Theatre.

When the group was in Tokyo to perform The Merchant of Venice, the Emperor of Japan was set to attend; however, the attempted assassination of the Russian Tsarevich during his visit to Japan became a grave international concern and limited the activities for the Japanese Court for several weeks.

== Family ==
Miln was married to the actress Louise Jordan, who regularly appeared with her husband. She was also known as a writer of travel books, especially of China, and novels, several being based on popular stage plays. Her novel Mr Wu (1918) was very popular. Her When We Were Strolling Players in the East was published in 1900.

At the time of their 1888–90 tour they had two infant children.

== See also ==
- Louise Jordan Miln
