= Miln =

Miln is a surname. Notable people with the surname include:

- Barnaby Miln (born 1947), British social activist and former magistrate
- Coby Miln (born 1999), New Zealand rugby union player
- David Miln (born 1985), Australian para skier
- George Crichton Miln (1850–1917), American Unitarian pastor and Shakespearean actor
- James Miln (1819–1881), Scottish antiquary who excavated many sites around Carnac in Brittany
- Louise Jordan Miln (1864–1933), American novelist, wife of George C. Miln
- Steve Miln (born 1966), New Zealand-born Japan former rugby union player

== See also ==
- Milne (surname)
- Milner (surname)
