= The Daily (News Corporation) =

- The front page of the first issue, February 2, 2011
- Type: Daily news application
- Format: iPad
- Owner: News Corporation
- Publisher: Greg Clayman
- Editor-in-chief: Jesse Angelo
- News editor: Michael Nizza
- Opinion editor: Rob Herritt
- Founded: February 2, 2011
- Ceased publication: December 15, 2012
- Language: English
- Website: www.thedaily.com

The Daily was the world's first iPad-only (with Galaxy Tab 10.1 and Facebook support added later) news app in the United States and Australia, owned by News Corporation.

It was originally planned to launch The Daily in San Francisco on January 19, 2011; however, the launch was delayed by News Corporation and Apple. The Daily was launched on February 2, 2011, at the Solomon R. Guggenheim Museum in New York City.

The journal was placed "on watch" in July 2012 due to disappointing results. Despite reporting over 100,000 paying subscriptions, the journal was losing an estimated $30 million annually.

On December 3, 2012, News Corporation announced that The Daily would cease operations effective December 15 as part of a reorganization of News Corporation's assets. Its URL now redirects to the site of the New York Post.

News Corp CEO Rupert Murdoch said The Daily "could not find a large enough audience quickly enough to convince us the business model was sustainable in the long-term".

== Scoop ==
The Daily is the first publication that made public the identity of Karen Kraushaar, a former employee of National Restaurant Association who filed accusation of sexual harassment against then CEO of the association and 2012 Republican presidential primaries candidate Herman Cain.
