= Anna-Louise Milne =

- Occupations: Professor of French and Comparative Studies

Academic background
- Education: Balliol College, Oxford University (1987-1991) Columbia University (1993-1999)
- Website: https://annalouisemilne.net

Anna-Louise Milne has been Professor of French and Comparative Studies at the University of London Institute in Paris since 2020. She is a specialist of twentieth-century literature and translation studies. She has also published widely on the history and literary representation of Paris. More recently, her work has focused on the impact of contemporary border politics on everyday life and political organisation in Paris.

== Education ==
Born in Edinburgh, Scotland, she attended James Gillespie’s High School, a comprehensive school where technical skills (metal work, technical drawing, sewing) were taught alongside the innovative Modern Studies programme. She studied Politics, Philosophy and Economics at Balliol College, Oxford, before transferring to complete her degree in French Literature and Philosophy (1987-1991). In 1993 she was awarded a President’s Fellowship from Columbia University to study towards a doctorate in Comparative Literature, ‘The Genealogy of the Commonplace’, supervised by Antoine Compagnon, and submitted in 2000. In 2016-17, she completed a diplôme universitaire in Transcultural Psychiatry at Université Paris Cité.

== Academic career ==
She joined the University of London Institute in Paris as a Junior Lecturer in 2001. She has been Director of Research and is currently Academic Director. She has led the development of the MA in Urban History and Culture, in partnership with Queen Mary University of London, as well as the Banister Fletcher Global Fellowship in Urban Studies. She has also worked at the American University of Paris, the École normale supérieure, and Nanterre University.

Her early work focused on literary reviews, on review publishing as a ‘contact zone’ between expatriate and exiled writers, and the role and writings of Jean Paulhan at the centre of twentieth-century French literary and intellectual history. This work subsequently has underpinned experiments in book-making with undocumented migrants, resulting in workshops sponsored by the Vaclav Havel Public Library (Paris), the Tate Modern Exchange Gallery (London), and the Museum of the Home (London). She has also worked on the legacy of May ’68 four decades after the events, on the history of Paris as source of literary inspiration, and the transformation of the French-language novel since le nouveau roman. She was previously a contributing editor to Francospheres and is currently a member of the French Studies advisory board.

== Activism ==
Anna-Louise Milne is a founding participant in the Quartiers Solidaires/P’tits Déjeuners Solidaires collective, supporting unsheltered migrants and vulnerable citizens in the La Chapelle district of Paris since 2016. The daily organisation of a free breakfast has fostered the creation of the popular carnaval Ô les masques in 2021 and the dance company La Permanence chorégraphique de La Chapelle in 2016.

== Publications ==
=== Books ===
- Habiter le point de fixation : Contre l'abandon. Paris: Eterotopia. 2025. ISBN 979-10-93250-75-5.
- A General Practice, The Cahiers Series. London: Sylph Editions. 2022. ISBN 978-1909631403.
- Contemporary Fiction in French, with Russell Williams. Cambridge: Cambridge University Press. 2021. ISBN 9781108468916.
- 75. Paris: Gallimard (Collection Blanche). 2016. ISBN 9782070116812.
- Cambridge Companion to the Literature of Paris. Cambridge: Cambridge University Press. 2013. ISBN 978-0-521-18213-3.
- France’s Last Revolution. Rethinking May 68, with Julian Jackson and James S. Williams, (London: Palgrave/Macmillan, 2011
- The Extreme In-Between: Jean Paulhan's Place in the Twentieth Century, Oxford, Legenda, 2006

=== Edited special issues ===
- Plural Cultures and Spatial Politics: Situating the Institut des Cultures d’Islam in the Postcolonial Landscape of Paris, Francosphères (7.2), 2018
- L’ailleurs en temps de globalisation/Elsewhere in times of globalisation, avec Ch. Forsdick et J.-M Moura, Fixxion. Revue critique de fiction française contemporaine, (16), 2018
- La Nouvelle Revue Française in the Age of Modernism, Romanic Review (99.1-2), 2008
