= Ernest Harker =

Ernest Gardner Harker (1868 - 25 December 1928) was an Anglican priest who was Archdeacon of Matabeleland from 1913 until 1927.

Born in Croydon, Harker was educated at Exeter College, Oxford and ordained in 1893. After curacies at St Paul's, Burton upon Trent and in Shrewsbury, he was Rector of St Mary and St Margaret's Church, Castle Bromwich from 1897 to 1911. He was Dean of Salisbury, Rhodesia from 1911 to 1913; and Rector of Bulawayo from 1913 to 1927.

He died on Christmas Day 1928.
