= Jimmy Milne (Australian footballer) =

Australian rules footballer

Personal information
- Full name: James William Milne
- Born: 19 September 1898; Allansford, Victoria
- Died: 26 June 1961 (aged 62); Moe, Victoria
- Original team: South Warrnambool
- Position: Centre / Half Forward

Playing career^{1}
Years	Club	Games (Goals)
1920, 1922–25	St Kilda	53 (4)
- ^{1} Playing statistics correct to the end of 1925.

James William Milne (19 September 1898 – 26 June 1961) was an Australian rules footballer who played with St Kilda in the Victorian Football League (VFL).

He represented the state of Victoria twice.

After leaving St. Kilda he went on to play for South Warrnambool, Coburg and Moe. He was known for his kicking skills.
