= Glenn Milnes =

New Zealand cricketer (born 1974)

Glenn Stefan Milnes (born 15 October 1974) was a New Zealand cricketer who played 47 games in all for Central Districts in the late 1990 and early 2000s. He played for the New Zealand Development team, New Zealand Youth team, Nelson cricket team as winners of New Zealand'd provincial Hawke Cup competition, Guernsey, Reading in the United Kingdom, and Gouda CC in The Netherlands. He was born in Motueka.
