= DFX =

The acronym DFX may refer to:

- DFX/ Digital FX
- Delta Force Xtreme
- Cosworth DFX
- AutoCAD DXF - Common file extension for CAD tools
- DFx (in engineering), refers to design for all desirable attributes:
  - Design for manufacturability
  - Design for assembly
  - Design for inspection
  - Design for test
  - Design for X
