= Cost reduction =

Process used by organisations to reduce costs

Cost reduction is the process used by organisations aiming to reduce their costs and increase their profits, or to accommodate reduced income. Depending on a company’s services or products, the strategies can vary. Every decision in the product development process affects cost: design is typically considered to account for 70–80% of the final cost of a project such as an engineering project or the construction of a building. In the public sector, cost reduction programs can be used where income is reduced or to reduce debt levels.

== Importance ==
Companies typically launch a new product without focusing too much on cost. Cost becomes more important when competition increases and price becomes a differentiator in the market. The importance of cost reduction in relation to other strategic business goals is often debated.

== Examples of cost reduction strategies and programmes ==
=== Commercial businesses ===
Consultants Deloitte reported in 2006 that over three-quarters of the FTSE 100 listed companies had commenced a cost reduction programme during the preceding 12 months. Cost reduction is most frequently stimulated by recognition that profits and profitability are below expected levels. A majority of cost reduction programmes reported in their survey had been sponsored by the Chief Executive Officer of the business concerned. Some examples of programmes include:

- Reductions in staff numbers (head count). Doherty refers to staff reduction exercises as "a quick and easy method" whose use often means that companies lack the resources they need when business activities recover.
- Component consolidation
- Function cost analysis / Value analysis / Value engineering
- Design for manufacture / Design for assembly
- Reverse costing
- Cost driver analysis
- Activity-based costing (ABC), which assigns a cost of each activity undertaken in the production and delivery of each product and service according to the actual consumption by each activity including a share of overheads. Peter Turney, in a 1989 article, examines the role of ABC in the achievement of manufacturing excellence and the product cost information needed by managers working towards this goal.
- Product benchmarking
- Competitor benchmarking
- Design to cost
- Property portfolio reviews addressing whether the estate occupied by a business continues to meet its needs, and also reviewing the tenure which it holds on the estate: Deloitte's survey of British companies noted that "smaller firms in particular" rarely take advantage of the cost reductions they can secure through sale-and-leaseback and similar deals.
- Incorporation of "low-cost thinking" into an organisation's culture.
- Half cost strategies: ambitious strategies which aim to reduce the costs of specific production processes or value adding stages to 1/N of the previous cost.

Examples specifically focussed on the use of suppliers and the costs of goods and services supplied include:

- Supplier consolidation: see examples in the aerospace manufacturing industry
- Low-cost country sourcing
- Outsourcing: experience in the United States suggests that businesses primarily outsource to reduce peripheral and "non-core" business expenses.
- Requests for quotations (RFQ)
- Supplier cost breakdown analysis
- Design workshops with suppliers

=== Public sector ===
In a public sector spending review, an overall target for reduction in expenditure may be identified: for example, in the United Kingdom, the 2010 spending review anticipated a reduction of £81bn in public expenditure over the four year budget planning period. In order to meet the challenges of a significant reduction in expenditure, government departments are expected to look at how they can "take cost out of the business" rather than simply cut services. One of the main principles expected of government departments in order to reduce costs is a "data-driven approach", i.e. ensuring that staff within the department have "a good understanding of the distribution and profile of costs in their business".

Centralisation of procurement activity has been highlighted as a beneficial public sector cost reduction strategy.

Scott Brown et al, of "Excellence in Business", note that in most cases, a successful approach to cost reduction which aims to maintain service quality "has at its heart an approach based on the principles of Systems Thinking": a fundamental review of the whole service, its purpose and objectives. The "Route Map for Change" which they advocate has been used effectively by Kent County Council for their highway maintenance contract, while the decommissioning of various warships and aircraft squadrons following the UK's Strategic Defence Review in 2010 is seen as a good example of a strategic option appraisal.

== See also ==
- Potential analysis
- Productivity
- Efficiency
