= Design for X =

Procedure and discipline in various fields

Design for excellence (DfX or DFX) is a term and abbreviation used interchangeably in the existing literature, where the X in design for X is a variable which can have one of many possible values. In many fields (e.g., very-large-scale integration (VLSI) and nanoelectronics) X may represent several traits or features including: manufacturability, power, variability, cost, yield, or reliability. This gives rise to the terms design for manufacturability (DfM, DFM), design for inspection (DFI), design for variability (DfV), design for cost (DfC). Similarly, other disciplines may associate other traits, attributes, or objectives for X.

Under the label design for X, a wide set of specific design guidelines is summarized. Each design guideline addresses a given issue that is caused by, or affects the traits of, a product. The design guidelines usually propose an approach and corresponding methods that may help to generate and apply technical knowledge to control, improve, or even invent particular traits of a product. From a knowledge-based view, the design guideline represents an explicit form of procedural or knowing-how-to knowledge. However, two problems are prevalent. First, this explicit knowledge (i.e. the design guidelines) was transformed from a tacit form of knowledge (i.e., by experienced engineers, or other specialists). Thus, it is not granted that a freshman or someone who is outside the subject area will comprehend this generated explicit knowledge. This is because it still contains embedded fractions of knowledge or respectively includes non-obvious assumptions, also called context-dependency. Second, the traits of a product are likely to exceed the knowledge base of one human. There exists a wide range of specialized fields of engineering, and considering the whole life cycle of a product will require non-engineering expertise. For this purpose, examples of design guidelines are listed in the following.

== Rules, guidelines, and methodologies along the product life cycle ==
DfX methodologies address different issues that may occur in one or more phase of a product life cycle:

- Development phase
- Production phase
- Use phase
- Disposal phase

Each phase is explained with two dichotomous categories of tangible products to show differences in prioritizing design issues in certain product life cycle phases:

- Consumer durables
- Capital goods

Non-durables that are consumed physically when used, e.g. chocolate or lubricants, are not discussed. There also exist a wide range of other classifications because products are either (a) goods, (b) service, or (c) both (see OECD and Eurostat, 2005:48). Thus, one can also refer to whole product, augmented product, or extended product. Also the business unit strategy of a firm is ignored, even though it significantly influences priority-setting in design.

=== Development phase ===
- Design rules
  - Basic rules of embodiment design: clarity, simplicity, safety (Pahl and Beitz, 1996: 205–236)
- Organizational process
  - Design for short time to market (Bralla, 1996: 255–266)
- System design, testing & validation
  - Design for reliability (Bralla, 1996: 165–181), Synonyms: reliability engineering (VDI4001-4010)
  - Design for test
  - Design for safety (Bralla, 1996: 195–210; VDI2244); Synonyms: safety engineering, safe-life design
  - Design for quality (Bralla, 1996: 149–164; VDI2247), Synonyms: quality engineering
  - Design against corrosion damage (Pahl and Beitz, 1996: 294–304)
  - Design for minimum risk (Pahl and Beitz, 1996:373–380)

=== Production-operations phase ===
- Design rules
  - Design to cost (Pahl and Beitz, 1996: 467–494; VDI2234; VDI 2235), see Target costing, Value engineering
  - Design to standards (Pahl and Beitz, 1996:349–356), see Interchangeable parts, product modularity, product architecture, product platform
- Design Guidelines
  - Design for assembly (Bralla, 1996: 127–136), (Pahl and Beitz, 1996: 340–349)
  - Design for inspection (Hitchens Carl (2014) Guide to Engineering Metrology)
  - Design for manufacturability (Bralla, 1996: 137–148), (Pahl and Beitz, 1996: 317–340)
  - Design for logistics, design for postponement (see Delayed differentiation)
- Specific situations
  - Design for electronic assemblies (Bralla, 1996: 267–279)
  - Design for low-quantity production (Bralla, 1996: 280–288)

==== Design rules ====
Design to cost and design to standards serves cost reduction in production operations, or respectively supply chain operations. Except for luxury goods or brands (e.g., Swarovski crystals, Haute couture fashion, etc.), most goods, even exclusive products, rely on cost reduction, if these are mass produced. The same is valid for the functional production strategy of mass customization. Through engineering design physical interfaces between a) parts or components or assemblies of the product and b) the manufacturing equipment and the logistical material flow systems can be changed, and thus cost reducing effects in operating the latter may be achieved.

==== Design guidelines ====
- Design for manufacturability ensures the fabrication of single parts or components that are based on an integral design in mechanical engineering terms. Every production technology has its own specific design guideline that needs to be consulted depending on the situation.
- Design for assembly addresses the combination of single parts or components to subassemblies, assemblies, modules, systems, etc., that are based on a differential design in mechanical engineering terms. An important issue is how the embodied interfaces within a product are designed (mechanical engineering, electrical engineering). Contrary, software or respectively firmware interfaces (software engineering, electrical engineering) are not significant for assembly operations, because these can be easily flash installed within one production step. That is a cost efficient way to enable a wide range of product variants.
- Design for logistics covers issues along supply chain partners (i.e., legally independent firms) but is by its means closely related to the design for assembly guidelines. In academic research, design for logistics is tangent to the strategic alliances, supply chain management, and the engineering part of new product development. For example, Sanchez and Mahoney (1996) argued that product modularity (i.e., how physical sub-systems of a product are sub-divided through interfaces; also called product or system architecture), and organizational modularity (i.e., how organisational entities are structured), depend on each other. Fixson et al. (2005) found that the relationship between product architecture and organisational structure is reciprocal in the contexts of early supplier involvement during system design and the concept phase of the product development process.

=== Use phase ===
- User focused, see Product design, Industrial design
  - Design for user-friendliness (Bralla, 1996: 237–254), see Usability, Ben Shneiderman, Emotional Design
  - Design for ergonomics (Pahl and Beitz, 1996: 305–310)
  - Design for aesthetics (Pahl and Beitz, 1996: 311–316)
- After-sales focused
  - Design for serviceability (Bralla, 1996: 182–194; Pahl and Beitz, 1996: 357–359),
  - Design for maintainability (Bralla, 1996: 182–194; Pahl and Beitz, 1996: 357–359; VDI2246),
- Design for repair-reuse-recyclability, a key part of the International Design Excellence Awards criteria

==== Comparison: consumer durables vs. capital goods ====
User focused design guidelines may be associated with consumer durables, and after-sales focused design guidelines may be more important for capital goods. However, in case of capital goods design for ergonomics is needed to ensure clarity, simplicity, and safety between the human-machine interface. The intent is to avoid shop-accidents as well as to ensure efficient work flows. Also design for aesthetics has become more and more important for capital goods in recent years. In business-to-business (B2B) markets, capital goods are usually ordered, or respectively business transaction are initiated, at industrial trade fairs. The functional traits of capital goods in technical terms are assumed generally as fulfilled across all exhibiting competitors. Therefore, a purchaser may be subliminally influenced by the aesthetics of a capital good when it comes to a purchasing decision. For consumer durables the aspect of after sales highly depends on the business unit's strategy in terms of service offerings, therefore generally statements are not possible to formulate.

=== Disposal phase ===
- Design for Environment (Bralla, 1996: 182–194), see also Life cycle assessment, Technology assessment, sustainable engineering, sustainable design
- Design for recycling (Pahl and Beitz, 1996: 360–372), design for disassembly
  - Active disassembly
  - Remanufacturing
  - Recycling of electrical and electronical equipment – Disassembly and processing (VDI2343)
  - Recycling oriented product development (VDI 2243)

== Similar concepts in product development ==
Several other concepts in product development and new product development are very closely related:

- Engineering Design: Design for X
- Time dimension: product life cycle, Product Life Cycle Engineering, product life cycle management (that is not the same like the product cycle in business studies and economics, see e.g. Vernon (1966)). Primarily, the unit of analysis here is a product, or more clearly, one item
- Meso-level organisation: concurrent engineering (American), simultaneous engineering (British), and overlapping-parallel product development processes
- Micro-level organisation: cross-functional teams, inter-disciplinary teams, etc.

Looking at all life stages of a product (product life cycle (engineering)) is essential for design for X, otherwise the X may be suboptimized, or make no sense. When asking what competencies are required for analysing situations that may occur along the life of a product, it becomes clear that several departmental functions are required. An historical assumption is that new product development is conducted in a departmental-stage process (that can be traced back to the classical theory of the firm, e.g. Max Weber's bureaucracy or Henri Fayol's administration principles), i.e., new product development activities are closely associated with certain department of a firm. At the start of the 1990s, the concept of concurrent engineering gained popularity to overcome dysfunctions of departmental stage processes. Concurrent engineering postulates that several departments must work closely together for certain new product development activities (see Clark and Fujimoto, 1991). The logical consequence was the emergence of the organisational mechanism of cross-functional teams. For example, Filippini et al. (2005) found evidence that overlapping product development processes only accelerate new product development projects if these are executed by a cross-functional team, vice versa.
