= Design for verification =

Design for verification (DfV) is a set of engineering guidelines to aid designers in ensuring right first time manufacturing and assembly of large-scale components. The guidelines were developed as a tool to inform and direct designers during early stage design phases to trade off estimated measurement uncertainty against tolerance, cost, assembly, measurability and product requirements.

== Background ==
Increased competition in the aerospace market has placed additional demands on aerospace manufacturers to reduce costs, increase product flexibility and improve manufacturing efficiency. There is a knowledge gap within the sphere of digital to physical dimensional verification and on how to successfully achieve dimensional specifications within real-world assembly factories that are subject to varying environmental conditions.

The DfV framework is an engineering principle to be used within low rate and high value and complexity manufacturing industries to aid in achieving high productivity in assembly via the effective dimensional verification of large volume structures, during final assembly. The DfV framework has been developed to enable engineers to design and plan the effective dimensional verification of large volume, complex structures in order to reduce failure rates and end-product costs, improve process integrity and efficiency, optimise metrology processes, decrease tooling redundancy and increase product quality and conformance to specification. Francis et al 2016 published the theoretical elements of the DfV methods showing, that by using the new design for verification methods alongside the traditional ‘design for X’ toolbox, the resultant process achieved improved tolerance analysis and synthesis, optimized large volume metrology and assembly processes and more cost-effective tool and jig design.

== See also ==
- Design for assembly
- Design for inspection
- Design for manufacturability
- Design for X
