= Rule-based DFM analysis for deep drawing =

Rule-based DFM analysis for deep drawing. Deep drawing is a widely used cold sheet metal forming process to draw the sheet metal in forming dye of desirable cross-section using mechanical force of the punch. DFM refers to design for manufacturability. DFA refers to design for assembly. DFMA stands for design for manufacture and assembly. It is a practice for designing the engineering components keeping manufacturing and assembly aspects in mind. DFMA tries to tackle the problems that may come during the manufacturing and assembly at the design stage itself. Changes in the parts design to remove these problems while keeping the functionality of the parts intact. This is done to reduce the cost of iterations thus making the manufacturing of components more efficient and economical.

In the deep drawing process, a blank of sheet metal (usually circular) is placed on the die. The die is fixed to the base. The metal blank is held in position on the die using blank holder. Mechanical force is applied on the part of the metal blank above the die cavity through a punch. As the punch force increases the metal flows from the flange region in to the die cavity.

Here is the rule-based DFM analysis for deep drawing process. These rules can be incorporated at the design stage to improve the efficiency of the process:

== Material of sheet metal ==
As the deep drawing is a cold forming operation, the germane properties of the sheet metal are formability, ductility and yield strength. The material should have good formability and ductility so that it can be drawn into the desired shape without any cracks. The yield strength of the material should be low facilitating initiation of the flow of metal without tearing near the punch radius.

== Clearance between punch and die ==
Clearance between the punch and die guides the flow of the metal into the die. Clearance should be more than the metal thickness to avoid concentration of metal at the top of the die cavity. Clearance should not be as large so that the flow of metal into the die region becomes unrestricted leading to the wrinkling of wall.

== Die corner radius ==
Radius of curvature at the die where the metal enters from the flange region into the die region is an important geometrical parameter. If the die corner radius is small than wrinkling near the flange region becomes more prominent. Too small die corner radius results in cracks due to sharp change in the direction of metal flow. Generally it should be 5-10 times the sheet thickness.

== Punch corner radius ==
As the metal draws into the die the thickness of the sheet decreases near in the lower region of the punch. Maximum reduction happens near punch corner because the metal flow decreases significantly here. Too sharp corner results in cracks near the punch base. Corner radius of punch should be 4-10 times the sheet thickness.

== Blank holding force ==
The friction in the flange region is mainly affected by blank holding force. Blank holding force is required for checking the amount of the metal flow in to the die. The low value of blank holding force results in wrinkling in the flange region and too high value of holding force results in increase in the drawing force due to the increase in the friction between the flange region. The blank holding force should be just enough to restrict the flow of the metal.

== Drawing ratio ==
Measurement of the amount of drawing performed on a sheet metal blank is quantified using drawing ratio. The higher the drawing ratio, the more extreme the amount of deep drawing. Due to the geometry, forces, metal flow and material properties of the work, there is a limit to the amount of deep drawing that can be performed on a sheet metal blank in a single operation. The drawing ratio is roughly calculated as, DR = Db/Dp. Db is the diameter of the blank and Dp is the diameter of the punch. For shapes that are noncircular the maximum diameter is sometimes used, or occasionally drawing ratio is calculated using surface areas. The limit to the drawing ratio for an operation is usually 2 or under .
