= Product analysis =

Examining product features, costs, availability, quality, appearance and other aspects

Product analysis involves examining product features, costs, availability, quality, appearance and other aspects. Product analysis is conducted by potential buyers, by product managers attempting to understand competitors and by third party reviewers.

Product analysis can also be used as part of product design to convert a high-level product description into project deliverables and requirements. It involves all facts of the product, its purpose, its operation, and its characteristics.

== Techniques ==
Related techniques include product breakdown, systems analysis, systems engineering, value engineering, value analysis and functional analysis.

- Product breakdown: Recursively divide the product into components and subcomponents.
- Systems engineering: Ensure that the product satisfies customer needs, cost requirements, and quality demands.
- Value engineering: Consider alternative designs and construction techniques to reduce cost/increase profit.
- Value analysis: Assess the cost/quality ratio to ensure that the product is cost effective.
- Function analysis: Ensure that the product has features appropriate to customer requirements.

== Technology analysis ==
Technological analysis is sometimes applied in decision-making often related to investments, policy-decisions and public spending. They can be done by a variety of organization-types such as for-profit companies, non-profit think tanks, research institutes, public platforms and government agencies and evaluate established, emerging and potential future technologies on a variety of measures and metrics – all of which are related to ideals and goals such as minimal global greenhouse gas emissions – such as life-cycle-sustainability, openness, performance, control, financial costs, resource costs, health impacts and more. Results are sometimes published as public reports or as scientific peer-reviewed studies. Based on such reports standardization can enable interventions or efforts which balance competition and cooperation and improve sustainability, reduce waste and redundancy, or accelerate innovation. They can also be used for the creation of standardized system designs that integrate a variety of technologies as their components. Other applications include risk assessment and research of defense applications. They can also be used or created for determining the hypothetical or existing optimal solution/s and to identify challenges, innovation directions and applications. Technological analysis can encompass or overlap with analysis of infrastructures and non-technological products.

Standard-setting organizations can "spearhead convergence around standards". A study found that, in many cases, greater variety of standards can lead to higher innovativeness only in administration. Tools of technology analysis include analytical frameworks that describe the individual technological artefacts, chart technological limits, and determine the socio-technical preference profile. Governments can coordinate or resolve conflicting interests in standardisation.

Moreover, potentials-assessment studies, including potential analyses, can investigate potentials, trade-offs, requirements and complications of existing, hypothetical and novel variants of technologies and inform the development of design-criteria and -parameters and deployment-strategies.

== See also ==
- Product information
- Quality function deployment
- Requirements analysis
- Value engineering
