= Critical area (computing) =

In integrated circuit design, a critical area is a section of a circuit design wherein a particle of a particular size can cause a failure. It measures the sensitivity of the circuit to a reduction in yield.

The critical area $(A_c)$ on a single layer integrated circuit design is given by:

$$A_c =\int_{0}^{\infty} A(r)D(r)dr$$

where $A(r)$ is the area in which a defect of radius $r$ will cause a failure, and $D(r)$ is the density function of the defect.
