= Target price =

Target price may mean:

- Target price in stock valuation, a price at which an analyst believes a stock to be fairly valued relative to its projected and historical earnings
- Target price in target costing, an approach to determine a product's life-cycle cost
