= Rule-based DFM analysis for direct metal laser sintering =

Rule based DFM analysis for direct metal laser sintering. Direct metal laser sintering (DMLS) is one type of additive manufacturing process that allows layer by layer printing of metal parts having complex geometries directly from 3D CAD data. It uses a high-energy laser to sinter powdered metal under computer control, binding the material together to create a solid structure. DMLS is a net shape process and allows the creation of highly complex and customized parts with no extra cost incurred for its complexity.

DMLS is being used to fabricate complex metal parts that are difficult to do so using traditional manufacturing processes thus gives immense freedom to the designer while designing the component. However, there are certain Design for Manufacturability (DFM) considerations that should be taken care of while designing the parts to be printed. DFM provides guidance to the design team in making the product structure more compliant to the given manufacturing process. It removes the wall between the designing and manufacturing phases of product development thus enables designers to take advantages of all the inherent costs and other benefits available in the manufacturing process. The early considerations of DFM principles and guidelines can lead to significant cost and time cutting in the final development of the product. Some of the common guidelines for DMLS are:

== Size ==
The size of the part that can be printed depends upon the printer that is being used. With the current technology a maximum build size of 228 X 228 X 304 mm can be achieved. Hence, the size of the part to be printed should be within required dimensions. DMLS has a minimum sintering width (depends on laser diameter) varying from 0.6 mm to 0.9 mm. This defines the minimum external feature size of the part and thus the design with any external features having smaller dimensions must be avoided.

== Accuracy ==
The accuracy and surface roughness of the part depends on the powder grain size ranging between 50 μm to 100 μm. The layer thickness which lies between 0.02 mm and 0.05 mm determines the resolution in the vertical direction. Therefore, the regions of the parts which require high accuracy should be designed with planned allowance of 0.1 mm to 0.5 mm and secondary finishing and/or machining operations should then be used to achieve the required accuracy.

== Overhangs ==
In DMLS, powder bed supports the parts and keep them held in place. However, support structures are explicitly required for most of the downward facing surfaces that make an angle less than 45 degrees with the powder bed. This is because powder bed alone is insufficient to hold the liquid phase of the metal that is created when laser is scanning the powder. Support structures are also required to restrict curling/warping of the melted powder due to high-temperature gradients. The overhangs having angles less than 45 degrees should be avoided if possible at the design stage. The main advantage of this is to reduce material usage and the post processing requirement of removing support structures from the designed components.

== Height ==
The total number of layers required to build the whole part is directly proportional to the height of the part measured along the build direction. Every layer of the part to be printed requires tightly laying compacted thin layer of powdered material using roller, tracing of laser according to the 3D data fed to the machine in the horizontal plane and incremental lowering of powder bed for the successive layer to be laid. These processes require a significant amount of time thus redesigning the product for smaller heights may save manufacturing time greatly. The build orientation should be such that the height of the part should be least along the build direction.

== Anisotropy ==
The main direction of heat flow which is generated by the laser at the top is along the build direction due to the fact that powder bed lying at the bottom is the major heat sink. The layered addition of material and the directional heat flow in DMLS lead to the growing of microstructural grains along the build direction leading to anisotropic properties. The structure printed through DMLS has weaker properties along the build direction. This anisotropy can be removed using heat treatment methods but they are highly energy intensive and costly processes. Hence, it is advisable to consider the anisotropy in the very beginning of designing such structural parts and the direction of largest stress in the structure should lie in the horizontal plane.

== Complexity ==
Being an additive manufacturing technique, DMLS doesn't incur any extra cost for the complexity of the part. The build volume along with the number of layers is what determines the production cost and time. DMLS eliminates the need for tool production however such technologies are impervious to economies of scale. Therefore, it is recommended to design parts with least amount of superfluous volumes, building only the relevant geometries. Furthermore, the parts should be designed to avoid assembly requirements because printing sub-assembly with intricate geometries is now possible.
