= Design for logistics =

Design for logistics is a series of concepts in the field of supply chain management involving product and design approaches that help to control logistics costs and increase customer service level. These concepts were introduced by Professor Hau Lee of Stanford University, and have the three key components: Economic packaging and transportation, Concurrent and parallel processing, and Standardization.

== Economic packaging and transportation ==
There are three levels, moving from operational, to tactical and finally strategic.

1. Common sense: Product and packaging must be designed so it is easy to ship and shelf (for instance, Rubbermaid design that fits Walmart's 14x14 shelving). Making a product much stronger and more rugged than necessary for its normal function typically increases parts cost, but sometimes it lowers the net cost by reducing the cost of padding and protection for shipping.
2. Facilitate logistic function: Must be easy to pack and repack, and easy to track.
3. Enables efficient design of supply chain and business model: For instance, IKEA's supply chain and business model (flat packages etc.)

== Concurrent and parallel processing ==
Modify the manufacturing process so that steps that were previously performed in a sequence can be completed at the same time. This will help reduce manufacturing lead time, lower inventory costs through improved forecasting, and reduce safety stock requirements, among other benefits.

== Standardization ==
The idea of standardization is to exploit economies of scale, and doing things once that can be applied many times. Standardization can be done through:

1. Parts: Where common parts are used in many different products
2. Process: Standardize manufacturing and product processes so that decisions about which specific product to manufacture can be delayed. This is in fact delayed differentiation.
3. Product: Also known as downward substitution. For instance, car rental companies frequently fill reservations with higher-end vehicles when the lower-end vehicles are not available.
4. Procurement: Standardize processing equipment and approaches that can be used for several products (for instance, one machine for both high and low end products).
