= Target costing =

Approach to determine a product's life-cycle cost

Target costing is an approach to determine a product's life-cycle cost which should be sufficient to develop specified functionality and quality, while ensuring its desired profit. It involves setting a target cost by subtracting a desired profit margin from a competitive market price. A target cost is the maximum amount of cost that can be incurred on a product, however, the firm can still earn the required profit margin from that product at a particular selling price. Target costing decomposes the target cost from product level to component level. Through this decomposition, target costing spreads the competitive pressure faced by the company to product's designers and suppliers. Target costing consists of cost planning in the design phase of production as well as cost control throughout the resulting product life cycle. The cardinal rule of target costing is to never exceed the target cost. However, the focus of target costing is not to minimize costs, but to achieve a desired level of cost reduction determined by the target costing process.

== Definition ==
Target costing is a structured approach used to determine and achieve the total cost at which a proposed product—meeting specific functionality, performance, and quality requirements—must be produced to deliver the desired profitability at its anticipated selling price over a defined future period. This concept emphasizes that products should be designed based on a clear understanding of customer needs and preferences across different market segments. The cost target is then established by subtracting a sustainable profit margin from the price customers are willing to pay at product launch and beyond.

The fundamental objective of target costing is to manage the business to be profitable in a highly competitive marketplace. In effect, target costing is a proactive cost planning, cost management, and cost reduction practice whereby costs are planned and managed out of a product and business early in the design and development cycle, rather than during the later stages of product development and production.

== History ==
Target costing was developed independently in both USA and Japan in different time periods. Target costing was adopted earlier by American companies to reduce cost and improve productivity, such as Ford Motor from 1900s, American Motors from 1950s-1960s. Although the ideas of target costing were also applied by a number of other American companies including Boeing, Caterpillar, Northern Telecom, few of them apply target costing as comprehensively and intensively as top Japanese companies such as Nissan, Toyota, Nippondenso. Target costing emerged from Japan from 1960s to early 1970s with the particular effort of Japanese automobile industry, including Toyota and Nissan. It did not receive global attention until late 1980s to 1990s when some authors such as Monden (1992), Sakurai (1989), Tanaka (1993), and Cooper (1992) described the way that Japanese companies applied target costing to thrive in their business (IMA 1994). With superior implementation systems, Japanese manufacturers are more successful than the American companies in developing target costing. Traditional cost-plus pricing strategy has been impeding the productivity and profitability for a long time. As a new strategy, target costing is replacing traditional cost-plus pricing strategy by maximizing customer satisfaction by accepted level of quality and functionality while minimizing costs.

== Process of target costing ==
The process of target costing can be divided into three sections: the first section involves in market-driven target costing, which focuses on studying market conditions to identify a product's allowable cost in order to meet the company's long-term profit at expected selling price; the second section involves performing cost reduction strategies with the product designer's effort and creativity to identify the product-level target cost; the third section is component-level target cost which decomposes the production cost to functional and component levels to transmit cost responsibility to suppliers.

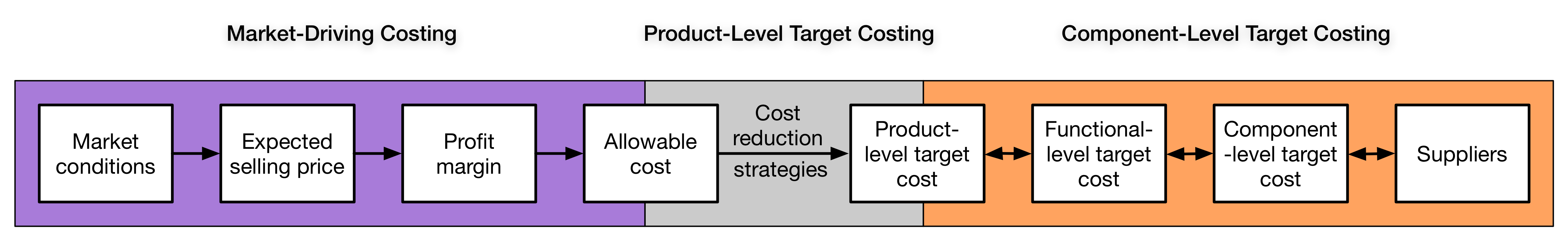
Target costing process

=== Market-driven target costing ===
Market driven target costing is the first section in the target costing process which focuses on studying market conditions and determining the company's profit margin in order to identify the allowable cost of a product. Market driven costing can go through 5 steps including: establish company's long-term sales and profit objective; develop the mix of products; identify target selling price for each product; identify profit margin for each product; and calculate allowable cost of each product.

Company's long-term sales and profit objectives are developed from an extensive analysis of relevant information relating to customers, market and products. Only realistic plans are accepted to proceed to the next step. Product mix is designed carefully to ensure that it satisfies many customers, but also does not contain too many products to confuse customers. Company may use simulation to explore the impact of overall profit objective to different product mixes and determine the most feasible product mix. Target selling price, target profit margin and allowable cost are identified for each product. Target selling price need to consider to the expected market condition at the time launching the product. Internal factors such as product's functionality and profit objective, and external factors such as company's image or expected price of competitive products will influence target selling price. Company's long-term profit plan and life-cycle cost are considered when determining target profit margin. Firms might set up target profit margin based on either actual profit margin of previous products or target profit margin of product line. Simulation for overall group profitability can help to make sure achieving group target. Subtracting target profit margin from target selling price results in allowable cost for each product. Allowable cost is the amount that can be spent on a product to ensure its profit target is met if it is sold at its target price. It is the signal about the magnitude of cost saving that team need to achieve.

=== Product-level target costing ===
Following the completion of market-driven costing, the next task of the target costing process is product-level target costing. Product-level target costing concentrates on designing products that satisfy the company's customers at the allowable cost. To achieve this goal, product-level target costing is typically divided into three steps as shown below.

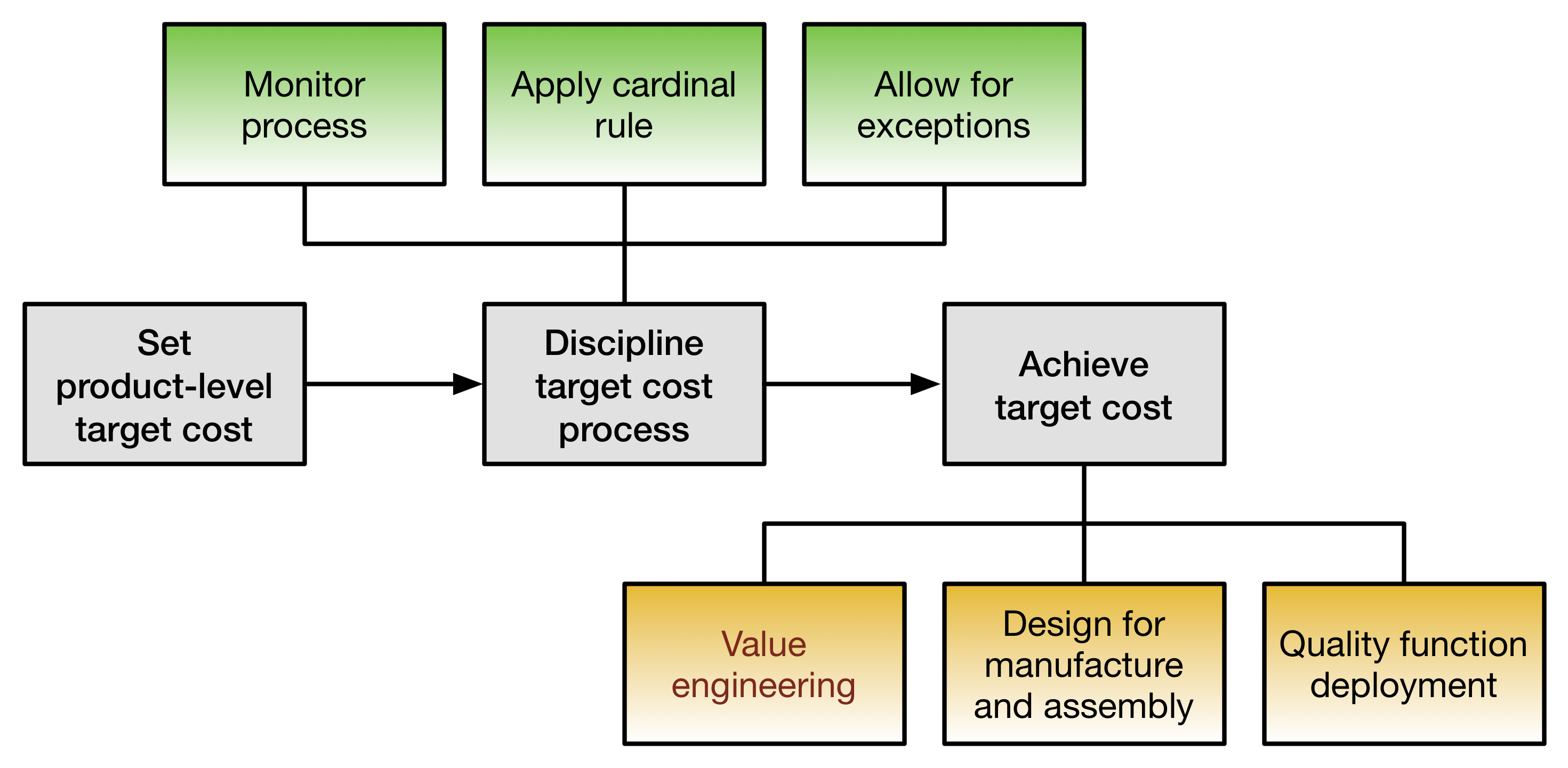
Product-level target costing

The first step is to set a product-level target cost. Since the allowable cost is simply obtained from external conditions without considering the design capabilities of the company as well as the realistic cost for manufacturing, it may not be always achievable in practice. Thus, it is necessary to adjust the unachievable allowable cost to an achievable target cost that the cost increase should be reduced with great effort. The second step is to discipline this target cost process, including monitoring the relationship between the target cost and the estimated product cost at any point during the design process, applying the cardinal rule so that the total target costs at the component-level does not exceed the target cost of the product, and allowing exceptions for products violating the cardinal rule. For a product exception to the cardinal rule, two analyses are often performed after the launch of the product. One involves reviewing the design process to find out why the target cost was unachieved. The other is an immediate effort to reduce the excessive cost to ensure that the period of violation is as short as possible. Once the target cost-reduction objective is identified, the product-level target costing comes to the final step, finding ways to achieve it. Engineering methods such as value engineering (VE), design for manufacture and assembly (DFMA), and quality function deployment (QFD) are commonly adopted in this step.

== Target costing and value engineering ==
Value engineering (VE), also known as value analysis (VA), plays a crucial role in the target costing process, particularly at the product level and the component level. Among the three aforementioned methods in achieving the target cost, VE is the most critical one because not only does it attempt to reduce costs, but also aims to improve the functionality and quality of products. There are a variety of practical VE strategies, including zero-look, first-look and second-look VE approaches, as well as teardown approaches.

Regarding the complexity of problems in the real world, implementing the target costing process often relies on the computer simulation to reproduce stochastic elements. For example, many firms use simulation to study the complex relationship between selling prices and profit margins, the impact of individual product decisions on overall group profitability, the right mix of products to enhance overall profit, or other economic modeling to overcome organizational inertia by getting the most productive reasoning. In addition, simulation helps estimate results rapidly for dynamic process changes.

== Factors affecting target costing ==
The factors influencing the target costing process is broadly categorized based on how a company's strategy for a product's quality, functionality and price change over time. However, some factors play a specific role based on what drives a company's approach to target costing.

=== Factors influencing market-driven costing ===
Intensity of competition and nature of the customer affect market-driven costing. Competitors introducing similar products has been shown to drive rival companies to expend energy on implementing target costing systems such as in the case of Toyota and Nissan or Apple and Google. The costing process is also affected by the level of customer sophistication, changing requirements and the degree to which their future requirements are known. The automotive and camera industry are prime examples for how customers affect target costing based on their exact requirements.

=== Factors influencing product-level costing ===
Product strategy and product characteristics affect product-level target costing. Characteristics of product strategy such as number of products in line, rate of redesign operations and level of innovation are shown to have an effect. Higher number of products has a direct correlation with the benefits of target costing. Frequent redesigns lead to the introduction of new products that have created better benefits to target costing. The value of historical information reduces with greater innovation, thereby, reducing the benefits of product level target costing.

The degree of complexity of the product, level of investments required and the duration of product development process make up the factors that affect the target costing process based on product characteristics. Product viability is determined by the aforementioned factors. In turn, the target costing process is also modified to suit the different degrees of complexity required.

=== Factors influencing component-level costing ===
Supplier-Base strategy is the main factor that determines component-level target costing because it is known to play a key role in the details a firm has about its supplier capabilities. There are three characteristics that make up the supplier-base strategy, including the degree of horizontal integration, power over suppliers and nature of supplier relations. Horizontal integration captures the fraction of product costs sourced externally. Cost pressures on suppliers can drive target costing if the buying power of firms is high enough. In turn, this may lead to better benefits. More cooperative supplier relations have been shown to increase mutual benefits in terms of target costs particularly at a component level.

== Applications ==
Aside from the application of target costing in the field of manufacturing, target costing are also widely used in the following areas.

=== Energy ===
An Energy Retrofit Loan Analysis Model has been developed using a Monte Carlo (MC) method for target costing in Energy Efficient buildings and construction. MC method has been shown to be effective in determining the impact of financial uncertainties in project performance.

Target Value Design Decision Making Process (TVD-DMP) groups a set of energy efficiency methods at different optimization levels to evaluate costs and uncertainties involved in the energy efficiency process. Some major design parameters are specified using this methods including Facility Operation Schedule, Orientation, Plug load, HVAC and lighting systems.

The entire process consists of three phases: initiation, definition and alignment. Initiation stage involves developing a business case for energy efficiency using target value design (TVD) training, organization and compensation. The definition process involves defining and validating the case by tools such as values analysis and bench marking processes to determine the allowable costs. By setting targets and designing the design process to align with those targets, TVD-DMP has been shown to achieve a high level of collaboration needed for energy efficiency investments. This is done by using risk analysis tools, pull planning and rapid estimating processes.

=== Healthcare ===
Target costing and target value design have applications in building healthcare facilities including critical components such as Neonatal Intensive Care Units (NICUs). The process is influenced by unit locations, degree of comfort, number of patients per room, type of supply location and access to nature. According to National Vital Statistics Reports, 12.18% of 2009 births were premature and the cost per infant was $51,600. This led to opportunities for NICUs to implement target value design for deciding whether to build a single-family room or more open-bay NICUs. This was achieved using set-based design analysis which challenges the designer to generate multiple alternatives for the same functionality. Designs are evaluated keeping in mind the requirements of the various stakeholders in the NICU including nurses, doctors, family members and administrators. Unlike linear point-based design, set-based design narrows options to the optimal one by eliminating alternatives simultaneously defined by user constraints.

=== Construction ===
Jacomit et al. (2008) noted that about 15% of construction projects in Japan adopted target costing for their cost planning and management. In the U.S., target costing research has been carried out within the framework of lean construction as target value design (TVD) method and have been disseminated widely over construction industry in recent years. Research has proven that if being applied systematically, TVD can deliver a significant improvement in project performance with average reduction of 15% in comparison with market cost.

TVD in construction project considers the final cost of project as a design parameter, similar to the capacity and aesthetics requirements for the project. TVD requires the project team to develop a target cost from the beginning. The project team is expected not to design exceeding the target cost without the owner's approval, and must use different skills to maintain this target cost. In some cases, the cost can increase but the project team must commit to decrease and must try their best to decrease without impacting on other functions of the project.

In Scotland, guidance on the use of pain share/pain gain arrangements and target cost contracting was issued to public sector construction procurers in 2017. This guidance refers to reimbursement to contractors calculated in two stages:

- an initial target cost and the percentage basis for the gain share/pain share calculations are agreed, and during the project the contractor is paid on a cost reimbursement basis
- on conclusion of the project, the final target cost is compared to the actual cost. The final target cost will reflect the initial target cost and any employer changes and employer risk events which have occurred during the construction period, and changes should be recorded as they occur. If the actual cost is less than the target cost, the contractor is rewarded with a share of the "gain" according to the pre-determined percentage, and if the actual cost is greater than the target cost, the "pain" is likewise shared between the employer and the contractor.

The guidance stresses the importance of "good faith and reasonableness" in calculating the target cost, but also notes the risk which arises when target cost arrangements are used without fully understanding how they are to operate.

== See also ==
- Design-to-cost
