= Design for maintainability =

Engineering design process

Design for maintainability is an engineering design process that considers the ability to perform routine maintenance in the design process of creating products, systems, and processes. Design for maintainability encourages modularity, decoupling, and standardization.

== See also ==
- Design for X
- Repair monopoly
