= Cost breakdown analysis =

Method of cost analysis, which itemizes the cost of a certain product into its components

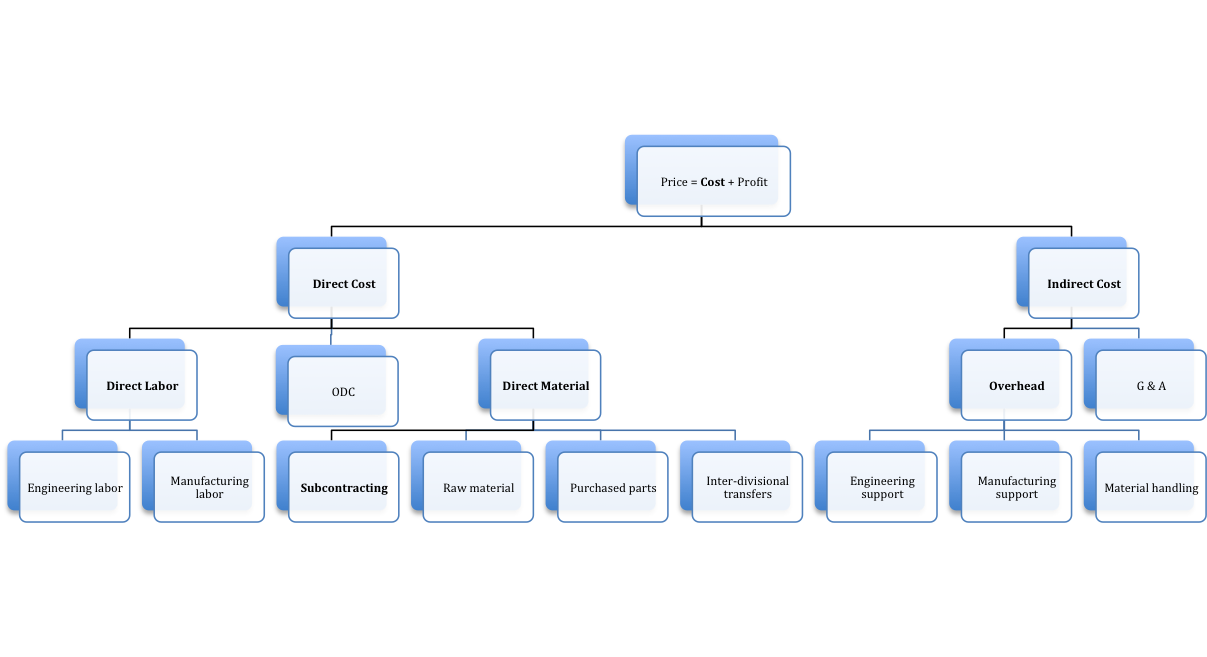
Components of price. Image according to Garrett (2008), figure 4-1, p.65

In business economics cost breakdown analysis is a method of cost analysis, which itemizes the cost of a certain product or service into its various components, the so-called cost drivers. The cost breakdown analysis is a popular cost reduction strategy and a viable opportunity for businesses.

The price of a product or service is defined as cost plus profit, whereas cost can be broken down further into direct cost and indirect cost. As a business has virtually no influence on indirect cost, a cost reduction oriented cost breakdown analysis focuses rather on factors contributing to direct cost. The most common factors among direct cost are labor, raw materials and subcontracting. These are aspects of a business, over which it has direct control and which, in turn, enables the business to identify ways to save expenditure by the proper application of a cost breakdown analysis. Businesses can also combine this strategy with a value chain analysis, which allows price forecasts and hence, quicker responses to changes in the market.

== Types of cost ==
=== Labor ===
Labor costs are direct costs, that is, they can be identified among the total cost and assigned to a certain cost objective. Labor costs are defined by categories (e.g. service labor or manufacturing labor), the attribution of a labor rate for each category, and a certain number of labor hours. Because of its identifiability, labor typically is one of the most common starting points of manipulation in the hope of cost reduction.

=== Material ===
Material costs include everything that is connected to materials that are purchased by the business, be it raw materials, parts and components, or manufacturing supplies. Expenses for insurance and freight can also be accounted as material costs. Accounting separates direct material from indirect material by defining direct material as having only one specific cost objective while indirect material can have multiple cost objectives. GopolangOctaviusRamonne0637460357

=== Conversion costs ===
Conversion costs cover any costs that are involved when processing raw materials to a finished product, such as manufacturing, utilities and maintenance costs.

=== Logistics ===
The costs involved with logistics can be further divided into sub-categories, which mainly regard custom clearance, transportation, warehousing and distribution. Each sub-determinant is influenced by different factors, that is, for instance, the costs for custom clearance depend on the respective importing country's customs policies.

=== Subcontracting ===
Subcontract costs involve all the expenses connected to subcontracting, that is, the outsourcing of contract obligations to a third party. Subcontract costs are generally treated as direct costs to the business.

=== Overhead ===
Overhead is an ongoing business expense which cannot directly be allocated to a particular cost unit, which is why they belong to the so-called hidden costs. Despite not directly creating profits, they do still contribute to the ongoing business activities. Overhead can, for instance, be in the form of company cars. Buying a company car and maintaining it is a business expense, which is not profitable as such. However, a company car is seen as an asset and employees can use the car to go to meetings or to run errands, so that the company car eventually turns out to be a good investment. Another example of overhead expenses is budget dedicated for travel entertainment. These expenses do not create direct profit but are still vital to the business.

== Examples ==
The following examples include fictional numbers, lack complexity concerning the cost drivers and are merely used to display the method of cost breakdown analyses. Transportation and corrugated boxes are very illustrative examples as they allow a simple break down of the total cost into the single cost drivers.

=== Transportation ===
In order to conduct the cost breakdown analysis, the starting point is to examine the various cost drivers of the service or product that is being analyzed. When itemizing the costs of transportation, one can come up with a simplified list of six cost drivers, namely:

1. Personnel (e.g. driver)
2. Motor fuel (diesel / gasoline)
3. Tires
4. Maintenance
5. Tolls
6. Other logistics costs

The indicators that have been identified are allocated percentages and in a detailed cost breakdown analysis these indicators should add up closely to 100%. This process requires an in-depth analysis of the business's expenses.

Cost driver	% of total costs
Motor fuel	42%
Personnel	35%
Electric energy	11%
Maintenance	6%
Tires	5%
Lubrication & wash	1%
TOTAL	100%

For simplicity's sake, these random percentages have been assigned to the six cost drivers of transportation this example entails. After this step, the cost drivers are being analyzed while the analyzing party (be it the business itself or an external agency) tries to examine possibilities to cut current expenses. The business might find 42% of total costs to be too much for motor fuel and might either want to look for an alternative supplier or change to more fuel efficient trucks. The cost breakdown analysis is even more effective when repeated constantly, so that changes in the respective shares in total costs of the various cost drivers can be tracked down. Over a five-year period, the share of expenses for tires might have risen from 5% to 8%, accompanied by a decrease of expenses for personnel from 35% to 32%, which featured the dismissal of workforce. The business might want to consider contracting a cheaper supplier of tires and reemploy its former employees.

=== Corrugated boxes ===
The second example derives from the packaging industry (for more detailed information on packaging markets, see the example of the Brazilian packaging market) . Corrugated boxes (packaging boxes made of corrugated fiberboard) are partly made of new material and of recycled material, which appear in the table as corrugated board and recycled corrugated board. The third largest determinant that drives the costs of corrugated boxes is the population's average nominal income. Additionally to the materials, expenses for electric energy as well as shipping fees have to be calculated.

Cost driver	% of total costs
Corrugated board	44%
Recycled c.b.	26%
Nominal income	21%
Electric energy	6%
Shipping fees	3%
TOTAL	100%

== Related analysis tools ==
=== Tear down analysis ===
Another method of breaking down costs is the tear down analysis. The difference to the cost breakdown analysis is, that tear down analyses only work with products and not with services, since the teardown of a product is meant literally. In a product teardown, the various components of a product are disassembled and the value of the physical components is scrutinized. Such analysis is only useful for those interested in the cost and quality of the components used in a product. It cannot be used as an estimation for a product's real production costs, as it ignores Research and Development, manufacturing overhead, logistics, retail and other costs.

=== Parametric estimating ===
Parametric estimating uses mathematic models in order to make reliable and logical predictions between a cost objective and its resultant costs.

Parametric estimating (also called parametric formulas) is a mathematical representation of cost relationships, that provide a logical and predictable correlation between the physical or functional characteristics of a project and its resultant cost.

— Larry R. Dysert, An Introduction to Parametric Estimating (2008)

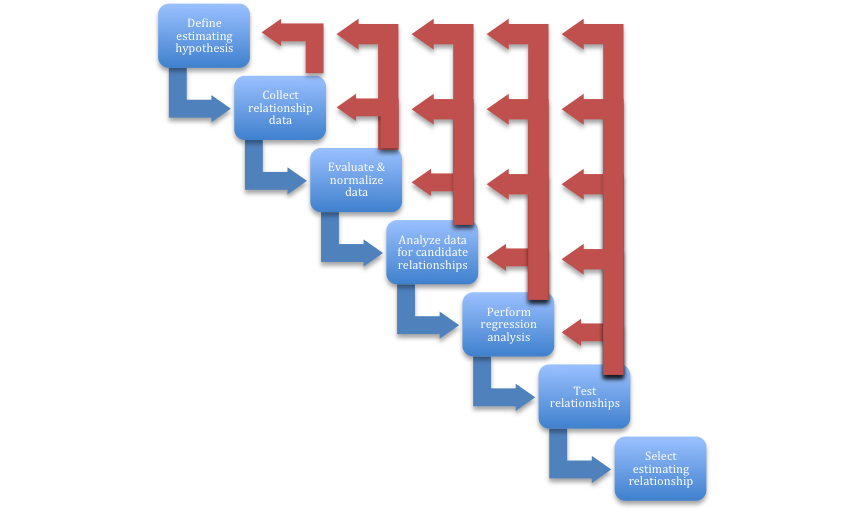
Parametric estimating process. Image in modified form according to NASA (2015)

In the mathematic model, the dependent variables (cost) are being regressed on the independent variables (cost drivers), which are physical, operational or performance characteristics associated with the project to be estimated. Pursuing decent results, the dependent cost variable needs to be regressed on multiple cost drivers. Additionally to that, this type of analysis avails itself from long-term data collection, that is, in order to create reliable cost relationship models, historical data and frameworks are required, which also have to be applicable to the new cost prediction project. Several factors have to be regarded in order to determine whether or not the previously used framework stays applicable to the new project, for instance, the technology used in the production or service process as well as changes in the legal framework.

Admirers of the parametric estimating technique laud five advantages to other cost prediction methods:

1. Efficiency: parametric estimating requires less time and a lower degree of project definition for supporting the estimates.
2. Objectivity: the method relies on algorithms that use quantitative input and also produce quantitative output. Hence, costs are comprehensible.
3. Consistency: if two estimators use the same set of data, they will get the same results. Besides, parametric estimating uses consistent estimate documentation.
4. Flexibility: proposed research design changes can easily be reacted to by adjusting the flexible models used in parametric estimating.
5. Defensibility: statistical relationship indicators like RSQ provide validity to the estimates produced by the model.
