= Rule-based DFM analysis for metal spinning =

Rule-based DFM analysis for metal spinning. Metal spinning is a lesser known metal forming and fabricating manufacturing process. It is more conventionally used for the manufacturing of axis-symmetric parts. Its ability to create parts that require high tolerance and high strength makes it an outstanding process to manufacture a wide range of parts for automobile, aerospace, defence and medical industries. Typical components produced by metal spinning are lamp bases, reflectors, hollowware (pitchers, tankards, vases, candlesticks, etc.), pots, bans bowls and components for electrical equipment. Design for manufacturability (also sometimes known as design for manufacturing or DFM) is the general engineering art of designing products in such a way that they are easy to manufacture. The concept exists in almost all engineering disciplines, but the implementation differs widely depending on the manufacturing technology. DFM describes the process of designing or engineering a product in order to facilitate the manufacturing process in order to reduce the manufacturing costs. DFM will allow potential problems to be fixed in the design phase which is the least expensive place to address them. Other factors may affect the manufacturability such as the type of raw material, the form of the raw material, dimensional tolerances, and secondary processing such as finishing.

Depending on various types of manufacturing processes that are set guidelines for design for manufacturability (DFM) practices. These DFM guidelines help to precisely define various tolerances, rules and common manufacturing checks related to DFM. Below are certain rule based standard guidelines which can be referred to while designing parts for metal spinning considering manufacturability in mind.

== Design considerations ==
The most common guidelines following design recommendations are not mandatory rules but rather suggestions for promoting ease of manufacture:

=== Metal thickness ===
The thickness of the metal to be spun can vary from about 0.1 mm (0.004 in) to 120 mm (4 or 5 in) on special machines and with hot material. The most common thickness, however, are 0.6 to 1.3 mm (0.024 to 0.050 in). Maximum thickness and size are limited only by the size of the equipment and the power available to make the metal flow.

Specifying material 25 or 30 percent thicker than the finished-part thickness is usually sufficient to allow for such reduction in wall thickness. However, material too thick for easy spinning should not be specified. Both extra-thick and extra-thin materials make spinning more difficult. For precision work, extra thick metal pieces may be spun and then machined to final dimensions.

=== Shape ===
In spinning, the conical shape is the easiest to form and the most economical. The metal is not subjected to such severe strain when worked down to its extreme depth because the angle at which the chuck meets the metal is small and allows better control of the metal during the spinning operation. The hemispherical shape is more difficult to spin because the angle grows increasingly sharper as the metal is forced farther back on the chuck. In spinning a cylinder, the metal is exposed to greater strain because of the sharp angle. This operation requires more time and skill.

=== Radius at corners ===
Blended radii and fillets are preferable to sharp corners for ease of spinning. Sharp corners tend to cause thinning of stock and, in the case of external corners, breakage of wood or masonite chucks. A desirable minimum is 6 mm (1/4 in), although 3 mm (1/8 in) usually causes no problems. In the spinning process, a metal is exposed to larger strains at sharp angles.

=== Spinning ratio ===
Spinning ratio is defined as depth to diameter ratio and serves as a critical metric for the spinning process. A rating of 100 indicates maximum suitability for the type of spinning indicated, while lower rating values indicate proportionally less ease of forming with spinning methods. It is preferred to use as shallow part as possible, i.e. avoid deep cylindrical designs, which require repeated operations and annealing. A spinning ratio of less than 1:4 is preferable. Spinning ratios are normally classified as follows: shallow (less than 1:4), moderate (1:4 to 3:4), deep(3:4 to 5:4).

=== Tapering angle ===
If the part has cylindrical sides and a wood chuck is used, allow a taper of 2° or more, if possible, to facilitate removal of the part from the chuck. With steel chucks, less taper is required, as little as 1/4° will be satisfactory.

=== Other design considerations ===
- It is preferred to avoid reverse-form designs, if possible, because they require additional operations and can cause considerable thinning of stock.
- The flatness of a flat-bottomed part will not be improved by the spinning operation. If bottom rigidity is important and flatness is required, a cone angle of 5° will provide rigidity and is easy to spin.
- A stiffening bead also can be rolled on the edge of the spun shell. It is preferable, from a production standpoint, to have the bead face outside rather than inside the part. Otherwise, re-chucking in a hollow external chuck will be necessary because both inside and outside beads are formed in air with no chuck support.

== Feature-based rules ==
Internal flanges and other configurations of re-entrant shapes are more costly to produce because they require special, more complex chucks or spinning without backup support for the work. Also, it is preferred to dimension parts to surfaces adjacent to the chuck (usually inside dimension). This allows the chuck maker to apply these dimensions directly to the chuck, and it avoids variations in diameter or length caused by variations in material thickness.
