= Geoffrey Boothroyd (engineer) =

British engineer and academic (1932–2024)

- Born: November 18, 1932
- Died: January 3, 2024 (aged 91)
- Education: University of London
- Known for: Design for manufacture and assembly (DFMA)
- Awards: National Medal of Technology and Innovation (1991); M. Eugene Merchant Manufacturing Medal (2001)
- Scientific career
- Fields: Manufacturing engineering
- Workplaces: University of Massachusetts Amherst; University of Rhode Island; Boothroyd Dewhurst, Inc.

Geoffrey Boothroyd (18 November 1932 – 3 January 2024) was a British-born manufacturing engineer and academic whose research and textbooks helped establish design for manufacture and assembly (DFMA). He held faculty positions at the University of Massachusetts Amherst and the University of Rhode Island, co-founded Boothroyd Dewhurst, Inc., and authored widely used texts on assembly automation and DFMA. He received the United States National Medal of Technology and Innovation in 1991 and the M. Eugene Merchant Manufacturing Medal of ASME/SME in 2001, and was elected to the National Academy of Engineering.

== Early life and education ==
Boothroyd was born in Radcliffe, Lancashire, England, on 18 November 1932. He earned a BSc in Engineering (1956), a PhD (1962), and later a DSc (1974) from the University of London.

== Academic and industry career ==
Boothroyd joined the faculty of the University of Massachusetts Amherst in 1967, where he began research on quantitative methods to estimate assembly time and reduce part counts—work that became an early foundation of DFMA. He later moved to the University of Rhode Island, where he spent nearly three decades and helped disseminate DFMA through teaching and collaborations with industry. With colleague Peter Dewhurst he co-founded Boothroyd Dewhurst, Inc., to translate DFMA research into analysis tools and training used by manufacturers.

== Research and publications ==
Boothroyd’s work on assembly time estimation and design simplification is summarized in his frequently cited article “Product design for manufacture and assembly” (1994), and in textbooks co-authored with Peter Dewhurst and Winston A. Knight that popularized DFMA in engineering curricula and practice. Independent trade coverage in Mechanical Engineering described DFMA’s use in reducing cost and time-to-market across industries.

== Honors ==
In 1991 Boothroyd and Peter Dewhurst received the U.S. National Medal of Technology and Innovation “for their concept, development and commercialization of DFMA…”. He was elected to the National Academy of Engineering and is recorded by the University of Rhode Island as one of its faculty elected to the Academy. Boothroyd received the M. Eugene Merchant Manufacturing Medal of ASME/SME in 2001, was inducted as an SME Fellow in 1986, and received SME’s Education Award in 1979. In 2021 SME named its Outstanding Young Manufacturing Engineer Award cohort in his honor.

== Selected works ==
- Boothroyd, Geoffrey (July 1994). "Product design for manufacture and assembly". Computer-Aided Design. 26 (7): 505–520. doi:10.1016/0010-4485(94)90082-5.
- Boothroyd, Geoffrey (2005). Assembly Automation and Product Design (2nd ed.). CRC Press. ISBN 978-1574446432.
- Boothroyd, Geoffrey; Dewhurst, Peter; Knight, Winston A. (2010). Product Design for Manufacture and Assembly (3rd ed.). CRC Press. ISBN 978-1420089271.

== Death ==
Boothroyd died on 3 January 2024, aged 91.
