= Function cost analysis =

Function cost analysis (FСА) (sometimes called function value analysis (FVA)) is a method of technical and economic research of the systems for purpose to optimize a parity between system's (as product or service) consumer functions or properties (also known as value) and expenses to achieve those functions or properties.

== History ==
This methodology for continuous perfection of production, industrial technologies, organizational structures was developed by Juryj Sobolev (Соболев, Юрий Михайлович) (Russia) in 1948 at the "Perm telephone factory" (Almost at the same time as L. D. Miles ).

- 1948 Juryj Sobolev (Соболев, Юрий Михайлович) (Russia) - the first success in application of a method analysis at the "Perm telephone factory" (Perm, Russia).
- 1949 - the first application for the invention as result of use of the new method.

== Basic ideas ==
- Interest of consumer not in products itself, but the advantage which it will receive from its usage.
- The consumer aspires to reduce his expenses (cost or price of functions).
- Functions needed by consumer can be executed in the various ways, and, hence, with various efficiency and expenses. Among possible alternatives of realization of functions exist such in which the parity of quality and the price is the optimal for the consumer.

== Method ==
The goal of FCA is achievement of the highest consumer satisfaction of production at simultaneous decrease in all kinds of industrial expenses (production costs). Classical FCA has three English synonyms - Value Engineering, Value Management, Value Analysis. It is not necessary to confuse method FСА as it takes place at some authors, to method Activity-based costing (ABC)

== Basic terms ==
- Technical system - the set of material elements (components) intended for satisfaction of any need of the person (society) or technical system of higher hierarchical level, possessing even one property leaving for the sum of properties of elements (components) making it.
- FCA object - subjected to the analysis of the HARDWARE or its elements.
- subsystem - the system which is a part analyzed HARDWARE.
- supersystem - the system including analyzed HARDWARE.
- Consumer property - ability of the HARDWARE to satisfy any need of the person (or society) or other HARDWARE.
- Expenses for maintenance and achieve consumer properties - the cumulative resulted charges on technical system at all stages of its life cycle.
- The cost analysis - definition of expenses for performance of functions and them
