= Reverse costing =

Reverse costing describes the process of disassembling (reverse engineering) a device to identify manufacturing technology and calculate its manufacturing costs through a cost analysis of its parts and the effort required to assemble them.
