= Rule-based analysis of extrusion process =

Extrusion is a plastic deformation process in which raw material (billet) is forced to flow by compression through the die opening of a smaller cross-section area. The extrusion process is divided in two basic types: direct extrusion and indirect extrusion. In direct extrusion the billet is pushed through the die with ram pressure, whereas in indirect extrusion a die moves relative to the container.

Rule-based analysis of extrusion process would help to determine a set of rules essential for consideration while designing a product, or even during cost estimation of a product. Some rules are discussed below.

== Material ==
Material of the profile to be extruded plays an essential role in determining process parameters and potential limitations of a process. For example, minimum thickness of extruded carbon steel sheet is 3mm whereas same sheet of aluminium can be extruded into minimum sheet thicknesses of 1mm. A variety of materials such as Carbon steel, aluminium, titanium, magnesium, ABS and PVC etc. can be manufactured via extrusion processes.

== Profile shape ==
Extrusion processes can extrude sheets into a high variety of profile shapes, but it is essential to consider profile features, to ensure product feasibility and strength.

=== Wall thickness ===
When deciding the wall thickness of any extrusion profile, strength and cost efficiency are two main factors. Though Uniform wall thicknesses are most easy to manufacture, wall thickness can easily be varied as necessary within a profile. If changes in the wall thickness are unavoidable, make them as gradual rather than abrupt variations. Thick with thin cross sections should be avoided, as material tends to flow faster where thicker sections occur, giving rise to more expected distortion in an extruded shape.

For an extrusion process wall thickness may vary from 1mm (aluminium) to 32mm (PVC).

=== Corner radii ===
Extrusion processes cannot achieve sharp corners without additional fabrication. Internal corners should be filleted with a minimum radius of 0.5-1mm, and sharp external edges should be rounded as those tips can easily become wavy and uneven.

=== Solid profiles if possible ===
Solid Profiles can reduce die costs and are often easier to produce.

=== Fewer cavities in hollow profiles ===
Varieties of hollow profiles are often very difficult to produce, but a hollow profile can be replaced by two telescoping profiles, to ease product manufacturing. In many cases reducing the number of cavities in a hollow profile makes it easier to extrude, which can also increases die stability.

=== Profiles with deep channels ===
For profiles with pockets or channels, a basic rule is that the width to height ratio should be approximately 1:3. This ensures that the strength of the die is not jeopardised. When using larger radii at the opening of the channel, and a full radius at the bottom, width-to-height ratios could rise to 1:4.

=== Heat sinks ===
Use of cooling fins on profiles greatly increases areas for heat dissipation. Surface area can be further increased by giving any fins a wavy surface. An undulating surface increases heat dissipation area of any fins. However, where there is forced air-cooling longitudinally along the profile, it can be better to leave fins smooth. This helps to avoid a problem of eddy formation.

== Surface finish ==
During an extrusion process it is essential to consider the surface finish of exposed product surfaces. As a general rule, the narrower an exposed surface, the more uniform its finish becomes. Webs, flanges and abrupt changes in metal thickness may show up as marks on the opposite surface of an extrusion, particularly on thin sections. The marking of exposed surfaces can be minimized with design changes such as rounding transitions, to reduce the chance of opposite-side streaking.

== Symmetry ==
Symmetry provides for more balance forces and helps avoiding over stressing areas of the extruding die. Hollow areas within the cross section, in particular, should be balanced.

== Length tolerances ==
Some waste tolerances are often included in a required extrusion's length. It can be difficult and expensive to cut a perfect length during production, as metals or thermoplastics expand and contract at different temperatures. Greater accuracy is often possible if lengths are cut off-line. A typical length tolerance for UPVC might be +/- 1mm (0.2%) on a 500mm total length.

== Extrusion ratio ==
Extrusion Reduction ratio is the ratio of the cross sectional areas in the shape of the die opening to that of the container through which the billet is pushed. A large-diameter billet pushed through a very small die opening has a high reduction ratio, and it may sometimes not be possible to extrude such a part. Ratios of 75:1 are common, though difficult.

The solution, however, for a difficult ratio shape is to make the part on a press with a smaller container. Another option is to use a multihole die that lets a number of profiles extrude simultaneously. They also come in handy for small shapes that are too long to handle practically, with even the shortest billets a press can extrude.
