= Design-to-cost =

Design-to-Cost (DTC), as part of cost management techniques, describes a systematic approach to controlling the costs of product development and manufacturing. The basic idea is that costs are designed "into the product", even from the earliest concept decisions on and are difficult to remove later. These costs are seen as an equally important parameter besides feature scope and schedule, the three taken together yielding the well-known project triangle.

By taking the right design decisions as early as during the initiation and concept phase of the product life-cycle, unnecessary costs at later stages can be avoided. But DTC also tries to capture the necessary measures for cost control during the complete development cycle. In DTC, cost considerations also become part of extended requirements specifications.

In contrast to the closely related target costing, DTC does not mean a product will exactly reach a defined cost, rather, it is about "considering cost as a design parameter in your product development activities". DTC can also be contrasted with Design-to-value which emphasizes the value that can be delivered to the customer, instead of the production costs for the manufacturer or company.

== See also ==
- Cost reduction
- Total cost of ownership
