= Rule-based DFM analysis for forging =

Rule-based DFM analysis for forging is the controlled deformation of metal into a specific shape by compressive forces. The forging process goes back to 8000 B.C. and evolved from the manual art of simple blacksmithing. Then as now, a series of compressive hammer blows performs the shaping or forging of the part. Modern forging uses machine driven impact hammers or presses that deform the work-piece by controlled pressure.

The forging process is superior to casting in that the parts formed have denser microstructures, more defined grain patterns, and less porosity, making such parts much stronger than a casting. All solid metals and alloys are forgeable, but each will have a forgeability rating from high to low or poor. The factors involved are the material's composition, crystal structure and mechanical properties all considered within a temperature range. The wider the temperature range, the higher the forgeability rating. Most forging is done on heated work-pieces. Cold forging can occur at room temperatures. The most forgeable materials are aluminum, copper, and magnesium. Lower ratings are applied to the various steels, nickel, and titanium alloys. Hot forging temperatures range from 93 to 1,650 °C (199 to 3,002 °F) for refractory metals.

== Types of forging ==
=== Open die forging ===
In open die forging a cylindrical billet is subjected to upsetting between a pair of flat dies or platens. Under frictionless homogeneous deformation, the height of the cylinder is reduced and its diameter is increased. Forging of shafts, disks, rings etc. are performed using the open die forging technique. Square cast ingots are converted into a round shape by this process. Open die forging is classified into three main types; cogging, fullering and edging.

=== Close die forging ===
Also known as impression die forging, impressions are made in a pair of dies. These impressions are transferred to the work-piece during deformation. A small gap between the dies called flash gutter is provided so that the excess metal can flow into the gutter and form a flash. Flash plays an important role during the deformation of the work-piece inside the die cavity. Due to the high length to thickness ratio of the flash gutter, friction in the gap is very high. Because of this, the material in the flash gap is subjected to high pressure. There is high resistance to flow. This in turn promotes effective filling of the die cavity. In hot forging, the flash cools faster as a result of it being smaller in size. This enhances the resistance of the flash material to deformation resistance. As a result of this, the bulk of work-piece is forced to deform and fill the die cavity more effectively – even intricate parts of the die cavity is filled.

== Workpiece temperature ==
During the forging process, the workpiece is either above the recrystallization temperature or below it. The former is known as Hot forging while the latter is known as Cold forging.

=== Hot forging ===
Hot forging is defined as working a metal above its recrystallization temperature. The main advantage of hot forging is that as the metal is deformed the strain-hardening effects are negated by the recrystallization process.

==== Advantages ====
1. Decrease in yield strength, therefore it is easier to work and takes less energy (force)
2. Increase in ductility
3. Elevated temperatures increase diffusion which can remove or reduce chemical inhomogeneity
4. Pores may reduce in size or close completely during deformation
5. In steel, the weak, ductile, FCC austenite is deformed instead of the strong BCC ferrite at lower temperatures

==== Disadvantages ====
1. Undesirable reactions between the metal and the surrounding atmosphere
2. Less precise tolerances due to thermal contraction and warping from uneven cooling
3. Grain structure may vary throughout the metal due to many various reasons

=== Cold forging ===
Cold forging is defined as working a metal below its recrystallization temperature, usually around room temperature.

==== Advantages ====
1. No heating required
2. Better surface finish
3. Superior dimensional control
4. Better reproducibility and interchangeability
5. Directional properties can be imparted into the metal
6. Contamination problems are minimized

==== Disadvantages ====
1. Higher forces are required
2. Heavier and more powerful equipment and stronger tooling are required
3. Metal is less ductile
4. Metal surfaces must be clean and scale-free
5. Intermediate anneals may be required to compensate for the loss of ductility that accompanies strain hardening
6. The imparted directional properties may be detrimental
7. Undesirable residual stress may be produced

== Categories of tolerances ==
=== Group 1 ===
Length, width and height tolerances, mismatch tolerances, residual flash (and trimmed flat) tolerances, and pierced hole tolerances.

=== Group 2 ===
Thickness tolerances and ejector mark tolerances.

=== Group 3 ===
Straightness and flatness tolerances and tolerances for centre-to-centre dimensions.

=== Group 4 ===
Fillet and edge radii tolerances, Burr tolerances, surface tolerances, tolerances on draft angle surfaces, eccentricity tolerances for deep holes, eccentricity tolerances for pierced holes, tolerances on concentric bosses, tolerances for unforged stock, and tolerances for deformation of sheared ends.

=== Deviations of forms ===
The tolerances for lengths, widths, heights, and thicknesses cover IL only the diligences of dimensions, but also the deviations of form which are: a) Out of round, b) Deviations from cylindricity c) Deviations from parallelism, and d) Other deviations from the specified contour. The deviations arc not to exceed the limits given by the tolerances. In extreme cases they may cover the whole fields of tolerances unless other is agreed to between the supplier and purchaser. Where restrictions deviations of form have been agreed upon, this shall be noted on the drawing.

== Design procedure ==
=== Information required by forger ===
In order to assist the forging supplier to utilize his experience to the best effect, both in designing the dies and tools and in establishing forging inspection procedures, rt is in the purchaser's interest to supply the following information:

- A finished machined drawing;
- Details and dimensions of machining locations (prior notice should be given of any subsequent changes in these location points)
- Anv other relevant information on machining operations and function of the component.

=== Preparation ===
It is recommended that the drop drawing which should then be submitted forger should prepare the forging to the purchaser for approval, and, if necessary, for joint consultation.

In instances where the purchaser wishes to prepare his own fully dimensioned forging drawing, it is no less necessary that the drawing of the finished machined component and the other information referred to above should be made available to the supplier.

=== Indication of dimensions on drawings ===
It is imperative to note that, with the exception concerning draft angle surfaces the tolerances indicated in this standard shall be applied only to those dimensions specifically indicated on the agreed forging drawing.

For this reason, the method of indicating dimensions on the forging drawing has a vital bearing on the dimensional control of the forging.

Tolerances for dimensions not shown on the forging drawing may not be taken from the standard but may be determined, if required, only by calculation based on the dimensions and tolerances which are already shown on the agreed forging drawing.

=== Indication of tolerances on drawings ===
All forging drawings should be endorsed, ‘Tolerances conform with IS: 3469 (Part II)-1974 unless otherwise indicated

For correct endorsement of forging drawings the following form of presentation of tolerances at the foot of the drawing is recommended:

Category: 1.Lengths and overall diameters 2. Widths 3. Heights 4. Mismatch 5. Residual flash and trimmed flat 6. Thickness 7. Straightness 8. Flatness 9. Fillet and edge radii 10. Surfaces

Any tolerances which are only applicable to specific dimensions shall be indicated on the drawing against the particular dimensions concerned. Ejector mark tolerances and burr tolerances should be shown on the forging drawing against the specific locations. Any special tolerances agreed between the purchaser and the supplier shall be indicated clearly on the forging drawing and shall, wherever possible be entered against the specific dimensions concerned.

=== Importance of drawings ===
The drawing of the forged part which has been accepted by the purchaser is the valid document for inspection of the forged part. This drawing is also the only valid document for tolerances on parts of the forging remaining unmachined

== Processes ==
There are many different kinds of forging processes available, however they can be grouped into three main classes: 1. Drawn out: length increases, cross-section decreases 2. Upset: Length decreases, cross-section increases 3. Squeezed in closed compression dies: produces multidirectional flow. Common forging processes include: roll forging, swaging, cogging, open-die forging, impression-die forging, press forging, automatic hot forging and upsetting.

=== Open-die drop-hammer forging ===
Open-die forging is also known as smith forging. In open-die forging a hammer comes down and deforms the workpieces, which is placed on a stationary anvil. Open-die forging gets its name from the fact that the dies (the working surfaces of the forge that contract the workpiece) do not enclose the workpiece, allowing it to flow except where contacted by the dies. Therefore, the operator needs to orient and position the workpiece to get the desired shape. The dies are usually flat in shape but may have a specially shaped surface for specialized operations; for instance the die may have a round, concave, or convex surface or be a tool to form holes or be a cut-off tool. Open-die forging lends itself to short runs and is appropriate for art smiting and custom work. Other times open-die forging is used to rough shape ingots to prepare it for further operations. This can also orient the grains to increase strength in the required direction.

=== Impression-die drop-hammer forging ===
Impression-die forging is also called closed-die forging. In impression-die work metal is placed in a die resembling a mold, which is attached to the anvil. Usually the hammer die is shaped as well. The hammer is then dropped on the workpiece, causing the metal to flow and fill the die cavities. The hammer is generally in contact with the workpiece on the scale of milliseconds. Depending on the size and complexity of the part the hammer may be dropped multiple times in quick succession. Excess metal is squeezed out of the die cavities; this is called flash. The flash cools more rapidly than the rest of the material; this cool metal is stronger than the metal in the die so it helps prevent more flash from forming. This also forces the metal to completely fill the die cavity. After forging the flash is trimmed off.

In commercial impression-die forging the workpiece is usually moved through a series of cavities in a die to get from an ingot to the final form. The first impression is used to distribute the metal into the rough shape in accordance to the needs of later cavities; this impression is called edging, fullering, or bending impression. The following cavities are called blocking cavities in which the workpiece is working into a shape that more and more resembles the final product. These stages usually impart the workpiece will generous bends and large fillets. The final shape is forged in a final or finisher impression cavity. If there is only a short run of parts to be done it may be more economical for the die to lack a final impression cavity and rather machine the final features.

Impression-die forging has been further improved in recent years through increased automation which includes induction heating, mechanical feeding, positioning and manipulation, and the direct heat treatment of parts after forging.

One variation of impression-die forging is called flashless forging, or true closed-die forging. In this type of forging the die cavities are completely closed, which keeps the workpiece from forming flash. The major advantage to this process is that less metal is lost to flash. Flash can account for 20 to 45% of the starting material. The disadvantages of this process included: additional cost due to a more complex die design, the need for better lubrication, and better workpiece placement.

There are other variations of part formation that integrate impression-die forging. One method incorporates casting a forging preform from liquid metal. The casting this then removed after it is cooled to a solid state, but while still hot. It is then finished in a single cavity die. The flash is trimmed and then quenched to room temperature to harden the part.

Another variation follows the same process as outlined above, except the preform is produced by the spraying deposition of metal droplet into shaped collectors (similar to the osprey process).

Closed-die forging has a high initial cost due to the creation of dies and required design work to make working die cavities. However, it has low reoccurring costs for each part, thus forgings become more economical with more volume. This is one of the major reasons forgings are often used in the automotive and tool industry. Another reason forgings are common in these industrial sectors is because forgings generally have about a 20% higher strength to weight ratio compared to cast or machined parts of the same material.

=== Design of impression-die forgings and tooling ===
Forging dies are usually made of high-alloy or tool steel. Dies must be impact resistant, wear resistant, maintain strength at high temperatures, and have the ability to withstand cycles of rapid heating and cooling. In order to produce a better, more economical die the following rules should be followed:

1. The dies should part along a single, flat plane if at all possible, If not the parting plan should follow the contour of the part. 2. The parting surface should be a plane through the center of the forging and not near an upper or lower edge. 3. Adequate draft should be provided; a good guideline is at least 3° for aluminum and 5° to 7° for steel 4. Generous fillets and radii should be used 5. Ribs should be low and wide 6. The various sections should be balanced to avoid extreme difference in metal flow 7. Full advantage should be taken of fiver flow lines 8. Dimensional tolerances should not be closer than necessary. The dimensional tolerances of a steel part produced using the impression-die forging method are outlined in the table below. The dimensions across the paring plane are affected by the closure of the dies, and are therefore dependent die wear and the thickness of the final flash. Dimensions that are completely contained within a single die segment or half can be maintained at a significantly greater level of accuracy. A lubricant is always used when forging to reduce friction and wear. It is also used to as a thermal barrier to restrict heat transfer from the workpiece to the die. Finally the lubricant acts as a parting compound to prevent the part from sticking in one of the dies.

=== Press forging ===
Press forging is variation of drop-hammer forging. Unlike drop-hammer forging, press forges work slowly by applying continuous pressure or force. The amount of time the dies are in contact with the workpiece is measured in seconds (as compared to the milliseconds of drop-hammer forges). The main advantage of press forging, as compared to drop-hammer forging, is its ability to deform the complete workpiece.

Drop-hammer forging usually only deforms the surfaces of the workpiece in contact with the hammer and anvil; the interior of the workpiece will stay relatively undeformed. There are a few disadvantages to this process, most stemming from the workpiece being in contact with the dies for such an extended period of time. The workpiece will cool faster because the dies are in contact with workpiece; the dies facilitate drastically more heat transfer than the surrounding atmosphere. As the workpiece cools it becomes stronger and less ductile, which may induce cracking if deformation continues. Therefore, heated dies are usually used to reduce heat loss, promote surface flow, and enable the production of finer details and closer tolerances. The workpiece may also need to be reheated.

Press forging can be used to perform all types of forging, including open-die and impression-die forging. Impression-die press forging usually requires less draft than drop forging and has better dimensional accuracy. Also, press forgings can often be done in one closing of the dies, allowing for easy automation.

=== Upset forging ===
Upset forging increases the diameter of the workpiece by compressing its length. Based on number of pieces produced this is the most widely used forging process. Upset forging is usually done in special high speed machines; the machines are usually set up to work in the horizontal plane to facilitate the quick exchange of workpieces from one station to the next. The initial workpiece is usually wire or rod, but some machines can accept bars up to 25 cm (9.8 in) in diameter. The standard upsetting machine employs split dies that contain multiple cavities. The dies open enough to allow the workpiece to move from one cavity to the next; the dies then close and the heading tool, or ram, then moves longitudinally against the bar, upsetting it into the cavity. If all of the cavities are utilizes on every cycle then a finished part will be produced with every cycle, which is why this process is ideal for mass production.

A few examples of common parts produced using the upset forging process are engine valves, couplings, bolts, screws, and other fasteners.

The following three rules must be followed when designing parts to be upset forged:

- The length of unsupported metal that can be upset in one blow without injurious buckling should be limited to three times the diameter of the bar.
- Lengths of stock greater than three times the diameter may be upset successfully provided that the diameter of the upset is not more than 1.5 times the diameter of the stock.
- In an upset requiring stock length greater than three times the diameter of the stock, and where the diameter of the cavity is not more than 1.5 times the diameter of the stock, the length of unsupported metal beyond the face of the die must not exceed the diameter of the bar.

=== Automatic hot forging ===
The automatic hot forging process involves feeding mill-length steel bars (typically 7 m or 23 ft long) into one end of the machine at room temperature and hot forged products emerge from the other end. This all occurs very quickly; small parts can be made at a rate of 180 parts per minute (ppm) and larger can be made at a rate of 90 ppm. The parts can be solid or hollow, round or symmetrical, up to 6 kg (13 lb), and up to 18 cm (7.1 in) in diameter. The main advantages to this process are its high output rate and ability to accept low cost materials. Little labor is required to operate the machinery. There is no flash produced so material savings are between 20 - 30% over conventional forging. The final product is a consistent 1,050 °C (1,920 °F) so air cooling will result in a part that is still easily machinable (the advantage being the lack of annealing required after forging). Tolerances are usually ±0.3 mm (0.012 in), surfaces are clean, and draft angles are 0.5 to 1°. Tool life is nearly double that of conventional forging because contact times are on the order of 6/100 of a second.

The downside to the process is it only feasible on smaller symmetric parts and cost; the initial investment can be over $10 million, there large quantities are required to justify this process. The process starts by heating up the bar to 1,200 to 1,300 °C (2,190 to 2,370 °F) in less than 60 seconds using high power induction coils. It is then descaled with rollers, sheared into blanks, and transferred several successive forming stages, during which it is upset, preformed, final forged, and pierced (if necessary). This process can also be couple with high speed cold forming operations. Generally, the cold forming operation will do the finishing stage so that the advantages of cold-working can be taken advantage of, while maintaining the high speed of automatic hot forging.

Examples of parts made by this process are: wheel hub unit bearings, transmission gears, tapered roller bearing races, stainless steel coupling flanges, and neck rings for LP gas cylinders. Manual transmission gears are an example of automatic hot forging used in conjunction with cold working.

=== Roll forging ===
Roll forging is a process where round or flat bar stock is reduced in thickness and increased in length. Roll forging is performed using two cylindrical or semi-cylindrical rolls, each containing or more shaped grooves. A bar is inserted into the rolls and when it hits a stop the rolls rotate and the bar is progressively shaped as it is rolled out of the machine.

The workpiece is then transferred to the next set of grooves or turned around and reinserted into the same grooves. This continues until the desired shape and size is achieved. The advantages of this process is there is no flash and it imparts a favorable grain structure into the workpiece. Examples of products produced using this method include axles, tapered levers and leaf springs.

=== Net-shape and near-net-shape forging ===
This process is also known as precision forging. This process was developed to minimize cost and waste associated with post forging operations. Therefore, the final product from a precision forging needs little to no final machining. Cost savings are gained from the use of less material, and thus less scrap, the overall decrease in energy used, and the reduction or elimination of machining. Precision forging also requires less or a draft, 1° to 0°. The downsize of this process is its cost, therefore it is only implemented if significant cost reduction can be achieved.

== Equipment ==
The most common forging equipment is the hammer and anvil. The principles behind the hammer and anvil are still used today in drop-hammer equipment. The principle behind the machine is very simple, raise the hammer and then drop it or propel it into the workpiece, which rests on the anvil. The main variations between drop-hammers is in the way that the hammer is powered; the most common being air and steam hammers. Drop-hammers usually operate in the vertical position. The main reason for this is because excess energy (energy that isn't used to deform the workpiece) that is not released as heat or sound needs to be transmitted to the foundation. Moreover, a large machine base is needed to absorb the impacts.

To overcome some of the shortcomings of the drop-hammer the counterblow machine or impactor is used. In a counterblow machine both the hammer and anvil move and the workpiece is held between them. Here excess energy becomes recoil. This allows for the machine to work horizontally and consist of a smaller base. Other advantages include less noise, heat and vibrations. It also produces a distinctly different flow pattern. Both of these machines can be used for open die or closed die forging. A forging press, often just called a press, is used for press forging.

There are two main types: mechanical and hydraulic presses. Mechanical presses function by using cams, cranks or toggles to produce a preset (a predetermined force at a certain location in the stroke) and reproducible stroke. Due to the nature of this type of system difference forces are available at different stroke positions. Mechanical presses are faster than their hydraulic counterparts (up to 50 strokes per minute). Their capacities range from 3 to 160 MN (300 to 18,000 tons). Hydraulic presses use fluid pressure and a piston to generate force. The advantages of a hydraulic press over a mechanical press is its flexibility and greater capacity. The disadvantages are that they are slower, larger and more costly to operate. The roll forging, upsetting, and automatic hot forging processes all use specialized machinery.
