= DFMA =

Product design methodology

Design for manufacture and assembly (often abbreviated DFMA or DfMA) is a product-development approach that combines design for manufacture (DFM) and design for assembly (DFA) to simplify product structures, reduce manufacturing and assembly costs, and address production considerations early in design. The methodology developed through academic and industrial research in the late 1970s and 1980s, then saw wider uptake through software tools and training. In 1991, Geoffrey Boothroyd and Peter Dewhurst received the U.S. National Medal of Technology and Innovation for the concept, development, and commercialization of DFMA. The term is also used in the architecture, engineering, and construction sectors, where DfMA emphasizes off-site manufacture, standardization, and platform approaches.

== History ==
Early research into assembly-friendly product design and quantitative evaluation methods focused on estimating manual and automatic assembly times and on reducing part counts to cut assembly effort. In the early 1980s, Geoffrey Boothroyd and Peter Dewhurst introduced design-for-assembly methods and associated software. Interest from large manufacturers helped spread industrial adoption and led to commercial offerings. A design-for-manufacture module followed in the mid-1980s, and the combined methodology, DFMA, was popularized through textbooks, training, and analysis tools. In 1991, Boothroyd and Dewhurst were jointly awarded the U.S. National Medal of Technology and Innovation recognizing their DFMA work and its industrial impact.

== Usage ==
=== Engineering product design and manufacturing ===
DFMA is used in concurrent engineering to guide simplification of product structures, reduce manufacturing and assembly costs, and quantify improvements. The practice aims to identify, measure, and eliminate waste or inefficiency in a product design. DFMA is therefore often positioned as a component of lean manufacturing. DFMA is also used as a benchmarking approach to study competitors' products, and as a “should-cost” input to supplier negotiations. Academic reviews survey DFMA methods across mechanical and electromechanical products. They discuss measurable effects such as part-count and assembly-time changes and the timing of design decisions.

=== DfMA in construction ===
While modernist architect Le Corbusier advocated industrialisation of construction in 1923, proposing "A house is a machine to live in", DfMA as a concept in construction began to emerge in the 1990s, as construction industry critics applied cross-sectoral learning, looking at production theory, integration of design, manufacture and assembly, and lean concepts and tools. In the early 21st century, DfMA began to be advocated by government and industry organisations including, in the UK, the Royal Institute of British Architects (2016, updated in 2021) and the Infrastructure and Projects Authority (IPA, 2018), in Singapore, the Building and Construction Authority (2016), and, in Hong Kong, the SAR Development Bureau (2018).

UK government construction industry policy continued to advocate DfMA approaches; it was included in the 2019 Construction Sector Deal, the Construction Playbook (2020, 2022), and the IPA's 2021 TIP Roadmap to 2030, and in 2018 the IPA and HM Treasury consulted about an expansion of the approach. The 2022 Playbook and TIP Roadmap subsequently encouraged procurement of construction projects based on product 'platforms' ("Platform Design for Manufacture and Assembly, PDfMA") comprising kits of parts, production processes, knowledge, people and relationships required to deliver all or part of construction projects.

The PDfMA approach has been applied to prison projects constructed by Kier Group for the Ministry of Justice, and to delivery of a Landsec commercial office building, The Forge in central London, constructed by manufacturing and assembly managers Mace and Sir Robert McAlpine, and designed by architects Bryden Wood, long-time proponents of DfMA.

== Documented results and case studies ==
Independent reporting in the 1990s summarized typical DFMA outcomes. These include reductions in part counts and assembly time for products that underwent redesign using DFMA methods and checklists. Academic reviews synthesize DFMA methods and measured effects across mechanical and electromechanical products.

Publisher-provided case studies hosted by Boothroyd Dewhurst, Inc. describe applications of DFMA across sectors such as agricultural machinery, aerospace components, and medical diagnostics. These are primary sources and should be interpreted accordingly. Examples named by the publisher include projects at John Deere, ITT, and IDEXX.

== Tools and software ==
DFMA methods are implemented in analysis tools. One implementation is the DFMA software suite from Boothroyd Dewhurst, Inc., which provides product simplification (DFA) and should-cost modeling (DFM). “DFMA” is also a registered trademark of Boothroyd Dewhurst, Inc.

== See also ==
- Design for manufacturing
- Design for assembly
- Modern methods of construction
- Modular building
