= Delayed differentiation =

Delayed differentiation or Postponement is a concept in supply chain management where the manufacturing process starts by making a generic or family product that is later differentiated into a specific end-product. This is a widely used method, especially in industries with high demand uncertainty, and can be effectively used to address the final demand even if forecasts cannot be improved.

An example would be Benetton and their knitted sweaters that are initially all white, and then dyed into different colors only when the season/customer color preference/demand is known. It is usually necessary to redesign the product specifically for delayed differentiation, and resequencing to modify the order of production manufacturing steps.

== See also ==
- Postponement
- Mass customization

Typically, all paint companies were burdened with the problem of having more than 200 shades, each available in more than 5 container sizes, making more than 1000 stock keeping units. The cost of keeping so many final products was almost killing the business.

Paint companies changed their process to make white paint and the dyes of three basic colours. The final mixing was done by a machine at the retail end. This minimised the inventory kept by the retailer whilst improving customer service by giving the customer a choice of millions of shades in the exact quantity required.
