= Design for inspection =

Design for inspection (DFI) is an engineering principle that proposes that inspection methods and measurement instruments used to certify manufacturing conformity should be considered early in the design of products. Production processes should be designed in such a way that features of the product are easy to inspect with readily available measurement instruments, and so that measurement uncertainty is considered in the tolerances that are applied. The concept can be applied in almost all engineering disciplines. DFI describes the process of designing or engineering a product in order to facilitate the measurement in order to reduce the overall costs of manufacturing and delivering products that satisfy customers.

The role of inspection in the manufacturing process is to ensure that the manufacturing process is producing components that meet the specification requirements. Inspection does not assure the quality of the product, only a robust and repeatable manufacturing process can achieve this. Therefore, inspection is often considered as an overhead although an extremely important one. Similar to design for manufacture (DFM) and design for assembly (DFA) (which seek to avoid designs which are difficult to make), the concept of DFI considers measurement capabilities at an early stage in the product development life cycle and uses knowledge of the fundamental principles of metrology to achieve cost reduction. If the inspection method and instruments are considered and selected at the design stage, the likelihood that a tolerance feature cannot be inspected or requires a specialised instrument is substantially reduced. High precision features require specialised manufacturing and metrology, these can have limited availability in the supply chain and therefore often have increased cost. The concept of DFI should complement and work in collaboration with DFM and DFA. There are three key areas when considering DFI, datum selection, tolerances and accessibility, plus general metrology considerations. Getting the most from inspection techniques will help improve quality. It is still difficult for systems designers to build machines that allow finished products to be inspected easily. To do so requires an understanding of the product being manufactured and how inspection tasks can improve the quality control process.

Inspection can represent a significant percentage of an existing product's manufacturing cost. DFI may naturally be called for in redesign of a product to reduce that cost component when it is high. However, DFI will not always reduce inspection costs: it can also lead to increased rate of inspection, because more convenient or higher quality measurement may justify increasing measurements, say from a sampling rate satisfactory to support a basic level of tolerance to a higher rate (e.g. to 100%). Or DFI may make it economical for 100% inspections to measure more features or to make repeated measures of the same feature at different points within the manufacturing process. This would be justified if it would reduce internal failure costs (such as costs of rework or scrap) or external failure costs (such as customer returns) within the cost of quality framework.

== See also ==
- Design for assembly
- Design for manufacturability
- Design for X
