= Potential analysis =

Management analysis method

Potential analysis describes the structural examination of specific characteristics and competencies of people. It provides information about employee abilities, future events, methods, or organizations. Consequently, separate branches of the field, such as production analysis, financial potential, research and development, and human resources, are differentiated.

A company may analyze its own potential in terms of productivity or market position by comparing it to competitors, known as benchmarking. A market can be analyzed to estimate the selling potential of a product. Processes can be structurally analyzed for optimizing potential.

== Quality criteria of a potential analysis ==
The bases of a qualitative potential analysis are the following quality criteria that need to be fulfilled for any kind of potential analysis.

- Validity: should show that the used potential analysis tool is suitable and whether the significance of the examination of future executives is established or not.
- Reliability: In potential analysis, reliability means making tests comparable. The potential analysis tools should produce the same results when carried out several times.
- Objectivity: The quality criterion of objectivity should ensure that the results of potential analysis are not disturbed by personal influences.

== Potential analysis in talent management ==
=== Importance of the potential analysis ===
Potential analysis in human resources is a part of talent management, characterizing the acquisition, development, and long-term retention of qualified personnel. Due to the expected future demographic change, the "war for talent", which is searching for and retaining talented employees, is likely to be intensified. Further, employers have to be attractive to potential employees. At present, transparent career paths and standardized processes are more important than high wages alone. Talents or "high potentials" need a professional perspective; otherwise, they will leave the company or even the country where they are working. A high number of well-educated professionals leave their home country annually. Potential analysis becomes important to avoid this migration. Talents need to be acquired, their skills developed, and ultimately, retention.

=== Objectives of potential analysis ===
The objectives of potential analysis are based on the identification, development, and retention of talents or future high-potential individuals. Potential analyses are used to identify talents who cannot be identified by school or college grades but based on social competence, flexibility, or emotional behavior. Using potential analysis, companies intend to achieve the optimal fit of individual–job and organization. This means an employee has to fit their job and purpose and the company and its corporate culture. For professionals, costs due to miscast amount to 50% of the annual salary plus wage labor costs, whereas for executives costs are 75%-100% of the annual salary plus wage labor costs. In addition, the company's future competitiveness and efficiency should be improved, along with its attractiveness as an employer in the “war for talent”.

=== Employee selection criteria ===
The selection criteria for employees are based on characteristics such as methodological expertise, social competence, professional competence, as well as critical thinking and competence in modification. All these characteristics are regarded as a part of an employee's potential. As these characteristics are difficult to measure, subordinate criteria are assigned. Due to a multitude of criteria, the division into cognitive, motivational, and social interaction criteria is used to make this multitude comprehensible. Cognitive criteria describe observational characteristics, such as organization, problem-solving, and flexibility. Leadership motivation, stress-coping, and self-confidence characterize motivational criteria, whereas communication, teamwork, and empathy belong to social-interactive criteria.

The choice of the selection criteria is substantial to the extent that a potential analysis is conducted. Human resource management should decide the criteria based on the future strategic requirements. Careful selection of criteria is based on knowledge of the target group. In the case of a university graduate, other criteria should be examined in comparison to a professional who wants to become an executive.

=== Quality features of potential analysis ===
Human resource managers should combine various methods to identify more specific characteristics and skills of a candidate. To find the optimal fit for a job or organization, an orientation toward the candidate's target profile and competencies is needed. Thus, it is important to provide precise competencies needed. A high-quality potential analysis is based on preparation and requires time. Potential analyses of single candidates require one day, whereas the analysis of a group needs up to three days. Given the time required, it is important that both the human resource professionals and candidates are prepared and have been introduced to potential analysis. Furthermore, it is important that candidates have the opportunity to receive feedback and an explanation of where their strengths and weaknesses lie.

=== Risks ===
Companies that ignore demographic and social changes and fail to recognize that their future competitiveness and efficiency depend on talented, qualified employees are at risk. Not identifying high potential individuals and developing their skills leads to insufficient and unsatisfying succession planning and, ultimately, to failed employee retention. Employees who are aware of their competencies and do not have the possibility to develop them will leave the company. Companies are facing costs due to employee miscasting. Potential analysis and transparent career paths could solve this problem. Companies with a good reputation have fewer problems in hiring young and skilled employees, while companies with a negative image fail to do so. A problem that might cause risks, considering the future “war for talent”.

== Potential analysis tools ==
Potential analysis in the field of human resources examines a person's potential. It is target-group-specific and business-specific; banks and the advertising industry cannot use the same tools for potential analysis.

=== Tests ===
Tests are the simplest and most standardized procedures for potential evaluation. They are considered to be observer-neutral and objective. For this reason, they are commonly used potential analysis tools. Tests can be distinguished into intelligence tests, performance tests, and personality tests.

- Intelligence tests measure intellectual abilities, such as mathematical analogies, in which the quality and speed of problem-solving is crucial. Intelligence tests generally have high validity.
- Performance tests are used to determine special abilities such as the ability to concentrate and responsiveness. These types of tests are used for potential evaluation for jobs with high, specific requirements.
- Personality tests: The purpose of personality tests is to measure emotional, motivational, and interpersonal characteristics. The results of these tests are compared to those of a reference population.

=== Interviews ===
In potential analysis, interviews are widely used and accepted. The validity of interviews varies substantially depending on the method used. Interviews can be divided into biographical and multimodal interviews.

- Biographical interview: In this kind of interview, self-interpretation of one's own biography is essential. The interviewed person should evaluate their strengths and weaknesses. This helps determine the candidate's behavioral pattern.
- Multimodal Interview: This is a semi-structured type of interview that combines a series of standardized and unconcealed interview sections.

=== Assessments ===
Assessments are structured procedures, characterized by independent exercises. Using this tool, a realistic simulation of professional tasks is provided. These are usually group processes with high validity and acceptance.

- Single assessment and hearing: Single assessments are structured procedures that combine various instruments and may last several hours. They are mainly used to select juniors, specialists, or experts. After passing the assessment, the candidate speaks to a committee of future superiors, colleagues, and the board of directors.
- Self-assessment: Self-assessment involves a candidate examining their knowledge, potential, and tendencies. This method is based on an IT-supported questionnaire and is mostly used for application-based positions.

=== 360° feedback ===
360° feedback is a mechanism in which colleagues, superiors, customers, and suppliers participate, with employees comparing their valuation with the valuation given to them by others. The comparison could be used for improvements. Therefore, the 360° feedback method is typically repeated periodically.

=== Management audit ===
A management audit is an evaluation process that estimates the leadership qualities and management skills of employees. External consultants examine employees' skills and potential with different tests. After that, an interview is used to present the employee's experience, competencies, and leadership qualities. The results of management audits are communicated by a recommendation.
