= Design for assembly =

Approach to design

Design for assembly (DFA) is a process by which products are designed with ease of assembly in mind. If a product contains fewer parts it will take less time to assemble, thereby reducing assembly costs. In addition, if the parts are provided with features which make it easier to grasp, move, orient and insert them, this will also reduce assembly time and assembly costs. The reduction of the number of parts in an assembly has the added benefit of generally reducing the total cost of parts in the assembly. This is usually where the major cost benefits of the application of design for assembly occur.

== Approaches ==
Design for assembly can take different forms. In the 1960s and 1970s various rules and recommendations were proposed in order to help designers consider assembly problems during the design process. Many of these rules and recommendations were presented together with practical examples showing how assembly difficulty could be improved. However, it was not until the 1970s that numerical evaluation methods were developed to allow design for assembly studies to be carried out on existing and proposed designs.

The first evaluation method was developed at Hitachi and was called the Assembly Evaluation Method (AEM). This method is based on the principle of "one motion for one part." For more complicated motions, a point-loss standard is used and the ease of assembly of the whole product is evaluated by subtracting points lost. The method was originally developed in order to rate assemblies for ease of automatic assembly.

Starting in 1977, Geoff Boothroyd, supported by an NSF grant at the University of Massachusetts Amherst, developed the Design for Assembly method (DFA), which could be used to estimate the time for manual assembly of a product and the cost of assembling the product on an automatic assembly machine. Recognizing that the most important factor in reducing assembly costs was the minimization of the number of separate parts in a product, he introduced three simple criteria which could be used to determine theoretically whether any of the parts in the product could be eliminated or combined with other parts. These criteria, together with tables relating assembly time to various design factors influencing part grasping, orientation and insertion, could be used to estimate total assembly time and to rate the quality of a product design from an assembly viewpoint. For automatic assembly, tables of factors could be used to estimate the cost of automatic feeding and orienting and automatic insertion of the parts on an assembly machine.

In the 1980s and 1990s, variations of the AEM and DFA methods have been proposed, namely: the GE Hitachi method which is based on the AEM and DFA; the Lucas method, the Westinghouse method and several others which were based on the original DFA method. All methods are now referred to as design for assembly methods.

== Implementation ==
Most products are assembled manually and the original DFA method for manual assembly is the most widely used method and has had the greatest industrial impact throughout the world.

The DFA method, like the AEM method, was originally made available in the form of a handbook where the user would enter data on worksheets to obtain a rating for the ease of assembly of a product. Starting in 1981, Geoffrey Boothroyd and Peter Dewhurst developed a computerized version of the DFA method which allowed its implementation in a broad range of companies. For this work they were presented with many awards including the National Medal of Technology. There are many published examples of significant savings obtained through the application of DFA. For example, in 1981, Sidney Liebson, manager of manufacturing engineering for Xerox, estimated that his company would save hundreds of millions of dollars through the application of DFA. In 1988, Ford Motor Company credited the software with overall savings approaching $1 billion. In many companies DFA is a corporate requirement and DFA software is continually being adopted by companies attempting to obtain greater control over their manufacturing costs. There are many key principles in design for assembly.

== Notable examples ==
Two notable examples of good design for assembly are the Sony Walkman and the Swatch watch. Both were designed for fully automated assembly. The Walkman line was designed for "vertical assembly", in which parts are inserted in straight-down moves only. The Sony SMART assembly system, used to assemble Walkman-type products, is a robotic system for assembling small devices designed for vertical assembly.

The IBM Proprinter used design for automated assembly (DFAA) rules. These DFAA rules help design a product that can be assembled automatically by robots, but they are useful even with products assembled by manual assembly.

== See also ==
- Design for inspection
- Design for manufacturability
- Design for X
- Design for verification
- DFMA

== Further information ==
For more information on Design for Assembly and the subject of Design for Manufacture and Assembly see:

- Boothroyd, G. "Assembly Automation and Product Design, 2nd Edition", Taylor and Francis, Boca Raton, Florida, 2005.
- Boothroyd, G., Dewhurst, P. and Knight, W., "Product Design for Manufacture and Assembly, 2nd Edition", Marcel Dekker, New York, 2002.
