= Art Projects International =

Art gallery in Manhattan, New York

Coordinates: 40°43′22″N 74°00′36″W

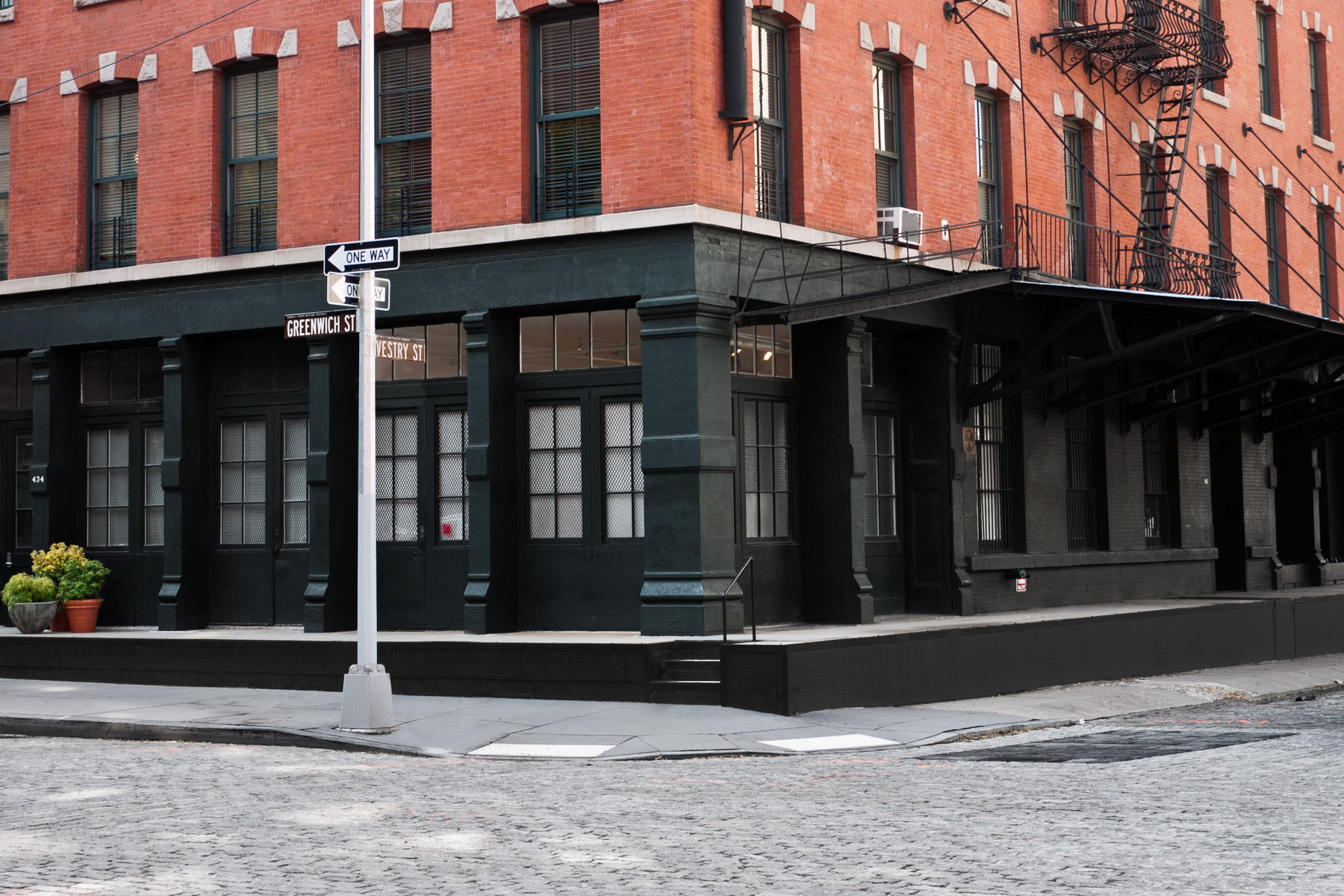
Art Projects International, Tribeca, New York City

Art Projects International is a contemporary art gallery located in TriBeCa, New York City. It focuses on works of art by leading contemporary artists with diverse international backgrounds.

== History ==
Art Projects International was founded in 1993 and opened its first commercial gallery space in the SoHo section of Manhattan. The gallery specializes in contemporary art, focusing on works by leading artists with diverse international backgrounds. It advises on and facilitates exhibitions of works by contemporary artists for museums, institutions and private collectors and has worked with the San Jose Museum of Art, the Brooklyn Museum, the Queens Museum of Art, the Crow Museum of Asian Art and The Vilcek Foundation.

Art Projects International launched its inaugural exhibition in 1994, showcasing recent works by the artist In-Hyung Kim.

In May 1996, the gallery was among a select group of galleries with exhibitions reviewed in The New York Times featuring young artists "indicative of the art world's growing internationalism."

In September 1996, it exhibited Yeong Gill Kim, a Korean artist living in New York, whose work in black and white acrylic, showed crowds of small figures in smudged landscapes, showing "on the conservative end of the spectrum in this case, that contemporary Asian artists are drawing ideas from a blend of Western and non-Western traditions."

In 2006, Art Projects International was part of a consortium of galleries staging Contemporary Asian Arts week, with particular emphasis on Chinese artists; it was one of the galleries making inroads to China through cultural exchange programs.

In March 2008, Art Projects International exhibited a survey of Iranian-born New York artist Pouran Jinchi's works, spanning a decade from 1995 to 2005. Here "the evolution of Jinchi’s abstract syntax suggested a symbiosis between the artist’s method and her minimalist format."

In March 2010, the gallery showed "a brilliant selection of ballpoint pen drawings" by Il Lee, a Korean-born New York artist, who has used the medium for over 30 years in a large variety of styles and sizes of composition.

In late 2011, Art Projects International presented an exhibition of Il Lee entitled Monoprints, Editions and Paintings. Four of the monoprints first shown in this exhibition were acquired by The Metropolitan Museum of Art for their permanent collection in early 2012.

The gallery's third solo exhibition of Pouran Jinchi, presented a series of new drawings in March 2012. One large-scale work from this exhibition was acquired by The Metropolitan Museum of Art for their permanent collection that same year.

In 2018, the gallery presented "The 90s," a solo exhibition of Il Lee that focused on works from the 1990s. The presentation notably featured three large-scale ballpoint pen on paper works, each measuring up to 82 x 61 inches (208 x 155 cm). A significant large-scale work on paper from the exhibition was subsequently acquired by LACMA for inclusion in the museum's permanent collection.

Art Projects International presented an exhibition of large-scale ballpoint works by Il Lee in 2024. The exhibition was reviewed in The New York Times Weekend Arts section, which noted: "Il Lee’s monochrome pictures are a study in contrapuntal forces: reduction and expansion; flatness and tactility; constructing form while also dissolving it.".

In 2025, the gallery presented its third solo exhibition of photographs by Seokmin Ko. This followed the artist's inaugural United States solo exhibition at the gallery in 2012. The 2025 exhibition, titled "HERE," was reviewed in The New York Times, which stated: "In each picture a square mirror appears near the center of the composition, with Ko’s hands just visible on either side, as if suggesting that the Arcadian landscape is more important than the image maker... Somehow Ko is still in this arrangement, along with the powerful idea that what’s beautiful in us is what we make to subtly endure."
