= Shohei Otomo =

Japanese artist (born 1980)

- 大友昇平
- Born: 1980 (age 45–46); Japan
- Education: Tama Art University
- Known for: Ballpoint pen artwork
- Father: Katsuhiro Otomo
- Website: shoheiotomo.com

Shohei Otomo (Japanese: 大友昇平, Hepburn: Ōtomo Shōhei; born 1980), sometimes stylized professionally as SHOHEI, is a Japanese artist known for his drawings with ballpoint pens.

== Early life ==
Shohei Otomo was born in 1980 and grew up in Tokyo. He is the son of manga artist Katsuhiro Otomo and his wife, Yoko. Starting at three or four years old, Otomo began drawing every day. He always envisioned that he would become an artist. His father did not give him drawing advice or lessons, and Shohei unsuccessfully tried to avoid being influenced by his artistic style, saying, "I had no intention of being influenced by my father, but now I see the influence in my work."

== Career ==
=== Medium ===
Shohei Otomo studied oil painting while attending Tama Art University, but switched to ballpoint pens to create ink art, as oil paints are expensive. He prefers ink pens to pencils, as pencils left a silvery finish he found undesirable. He uses "ordinary ballpoints that you can buy anywhere for about 80 yen". Additionally, he uses permanent markers for coloring in objects. He creates the drawings on paperboard, though, at one gallery exhibition in Japan, he applied acrylic paint to a human model in a live sketching session. He spends up to a month on an illustration. A 2017 exhibition in Australia marked his first use of sculpture: He designed a sumo wrestler, which he then illustrated with tattoo-like graphics.

=== Inspiration and symbolism ===
Otomo's work blends references to ukiyo-e, a kind of traditional Japanese art, and clichés that the rest of the world has about Japan. The works often contain tension between opposing concepts, such as traditionalism and progress, the Eastern and Western worlds, or order and chaos. His work is inspired by the stress of Tokyo, a city he finds "suffocating".

=== Style ===
Otomo's illustrations are described as hyperrealistic with cyberpunk elements. When including human figures in his art, he tends to cover their eyes with goggles, justifying this by saying, "if you show the eyes, the character’s presence overwhelms the picture". The only colors present in his art are black, white, and red, which he states is inspired by the color combination's use in ancient Japanese makeup: "the only colors used were red, black, and white: red lipstick, black teeth—Japanese women used to paint their teeth black—and white powder."

=== Exhibitions ===
His first art exhibition was in the US at DalArts gallery in Kansas City in the early 2000s. In 2012, he had his first art exhibition in Australia with an exhibition called Fool's Paradise. In 2017, he had this third gallery exhibition in Australia. Australian gallery director Alexander Mitchell of Backwoods Gallery called Otomo "most talented person I know", saying, "His technique is incredible, his work is flawless and his imagery is awe inspiring."

He has additionally had his work displayed in exhibitions in France, Italy, and Mexico.
