= Il Lee =

South Korean-American artist (born 1952)

- Born: Il Lee (이일); 1952 (age 73–74); Seoul, South Korea
- Education: BFA, Hongik University, Seoul, South Korea; MFA, Pratt Institute, New York
- Known for: Ballpoint pen abstractions
- Movement: Abstract art

Il Lee (Korean: 이일; born 1952) is a South Korean-born American contemporary artist. He was born in South Korea and has been living in America since the mid-1970s. Il Lee is best known for his ballpoint pen artwork; large-scale abstract imagery on paper and canvas. He also creates artwork in a similar vein utilizing acrylic and oil paint on canvas. Exhibitions of Il Lee's artwork have been held in Seoul, Tokyo, Hong Kong, Paris, New Delhi, Mexico City, and numerous cities across the United States. The New York Times has described Lee's ballpoint artwork as "deceptively casual; sweeping, rhythmical abstractions in blue."

== Early life ==
Il Lee was born in Seoul, South Korea, in 1952. His family originates from the mountains of North Korea, who made their way to South Korea in the years prior to the Korean war. His father studied architecture and engineering, but was unable to pursue it due to the outbreak of war. Lee has five siblings, and describes his family as "big" for his generation.

Lee received his B.F.A. (painting) in 1976 from Hongik University, a Korean school said to be "Western oriented." His paintings during the late-1970s were oil on canvas, presented as "geometric abstraction." The artist himself later described some of those works as "labor-intensive."

Lee then moved to America; first to Los Angeles, then to New York, where he earned his M.F.A. from the Pratt Institute in 1982. His artwork went through natural changes upon arriving in New York — "because I was in New York," as he has reflected — adding he may have "wanted to wash away the processes of the past." Lee remained in New York.

== Artwork ==
Lee began working with ballpoint pens during his time at Pratt in the early 1980s. He studied etching as his minor at Pratt, and the sharp needles became a preferred tool. The sharpness of its line interested him enough to continue pursuing it through other avenues. Lee participated in the group exhibition "Korean Drawing" at the Brooklyn Museum in 1981, introducing his ballpoint drawings. Those earlier works were all drawn on paper, but Lee soon began to work on large, primed canvases.

The artist spends weeks, sometimes months, applying layer upon layer of ink to each artwork. Linework is built-up through a "scribbling" technique reliant upon the "speed, spin, and angle" of his pen in repetitive motions, sometimes becoming so dense that the line-work becomes a flat field of ink. The thicker layers can appear coagulated on the surface of the paper or canvas, with the dried ballpoint ink giving off a shiny purplish-blue hue. When working with paint on canvas Lee utilizes empty pen casings and other tools such as bamboo sticks, scribbling in the same gestural manner onto a wet surface layer to reveal colors underneath — an inversion of his ballpoint method.

=== Content & Interpretation ===
Il Lee's artwork is categorized by some as minimalist in content, but has also been described as "deceptively casual," with more work going into each piece than immediately apparent. The repetitive quality of Lee's swirly strokes has been likened to effects associated with the common spirograph. Comparisons to geographic features are also common, setting Lee's abstractions apart from "merely decorative" counterparts. Reviewers point out hints of mountain ranges evoking panoramic landscapes and rocks emerging from an imagined mist. Undefined forms appearing in works such as MMC-081 have also been interpreted as organic overgrowth or vines.

Il Lee attaches no descriptive titles to his artwork. Instead, the artist uses his own system of letters and numbers to catalogue his work. Successive numberings such as SBK-089, SBK-0810, and SBK-0811 infer a sequence of related output. A pair of modestly-sized works on canvas from 2012 hint at a method to Lee's system of titles; paint combinations of white-over-red and white-over-blue are titled WR-1201 and WB-1201, respectively.

Dimensions of Lee's works on paper range from conventionally-sized up to impressively proportioned; some occupying a full wall. Lee uses the largest paper available; rolls with a 60-inch width allow him to create lengthy artwork. One of Il Lee's most "ambitious" ballpoint artworks measures 50-feet wide, and reportedly required over 400 pens during nearly three months of the artist's attention. His paintings on canvas reach similar scale. Lee has stated that producing small works can sometimes be "limiting," adding that producing larger works provides certain satisfaction.

Il Lee describes his creative process as "intuitive," a term he came to identify with during his time at Pratt. He prefers approaching his work with an empty mind and minimal forethought. While drawing, he directs his focus to the surface before him, allowing his gestures freedom while maintaining control.

Like surprise, confusion is not bad to have. Il Lee, commenting on critical debate as to whether his artworks are drawings or paintings.

=== Reception ===
Art critic Edward Leffingwell writes in Art in America of Il Lee's 2006 solo exhibition at Art Projects International,

"There is an almost palpable liquidity in the dense, indigo heart of Il Lee's recent production. Using common ballpoint pens, he locates a point or describes an arc or line on his paper or canvas support. The ink becomes increasingly fluid with the heat of his hand as he works, and an increasingly solid form ventures its incessant spread, as though the artist were determined to obliterate the ground entirely. At the edges, the sweep of line slows and reclaims its identity as a distinct part among the skeins of marks. Yet the work has come as close to painting as drawing can."

Reviewing Il Lee's 2007 mid-career retrospective at the San Jose Museum of Art, Kenneth Baker of the San Francisco Chronicle writes, "We might read in Lee's piece an echo of the ancient divisions of reality into heaven and earth, or light and darkness. But the seemingly automatic action of his hand, tempered by the hard boundary above and the thinning of marks below, asserts itself everywhere as something that outraces any intellectual agenda. A broad program seems to have guided the making of this piece, and most of the others on view. Consciousness of the working surface—how to divide it, how to apportion the weight of marking—appears uppermost. He leaves us to decide whether the apparent effects of light, mood and atmosphere arise more from his process or from our desire to see meaning in it."

Benjamin Gennocchio reviewed Il Lee's 2007 solo exhibition at the Queens Museum for The New York Times, noting the "unexpected suggestiveness" of Lee's artwork and describing the "simple, minimal forms" as "instinctively seductive." While The New Yorker states that Il Lee has "mastered his medium." Explaining that, "He knows how the ink will warm to produce a free-flowing line; he's learned how to build up shadow and leave room for light. His works, which integrate Sol LeWitt-style minimalism and sumukhwai, an Asian ink-painting tradition, range from small studies to a new, fifty-foot-long work on paper that looks like an abstract meditation on a mountain range. Lee's bent toward geometric abstraction and his slow accumulation of marks and lines suggest a freehand version of Spirograph suffused with Zen-like grace."

In a review of Il Lee's 2010 solo exhibition at the Crow Collection in Dallas, Texas, D magazine's Lucia Simek reported that "calm and frenzy lay down together" in Lee's artwork, which "harness so much power, through such effort, so quietly."

In The New York Times 2013 review of Extreme Drawing at the Aldrich Contemporary Art Museum, Martha Schwendener writes, "'Ballpoint Pen Drawing Since 1950,' features work by nearly a dozen artists created with the humble ballpoint pen… Here you have ballpoint masters like Il Lee, whose abstract 'BL-120' (2011) uses the pen's minute hatching capabilities, as well as the shininess of its ink, to full effect…"

Il Lee's 2024 solo exhibition "4 Paintings," presented at Art Projects International was critically examined in The New York Times. Art critic Max Lakin writes, "Il Lee’s monochrome pictures are a study in contrapuntal forces: reduction and expansion; flatness and tactility; constructing form while also dissolving it. Lee’s work, done mostly with just ballpoint pen on canvas, suggests paint where there’s none. Restriction like that can be useful, and these works’ nuanced, nearly imperceptible shifts in tone and texture elevate the lowly Bic to the lofty status of acrylics and oils…"

== Notable exhibitions ==
- 2025 Solo exhibition, Il Lee – Energy and Flow: Abstraction of Movements, The Vilcek Foundation, New York.
- 2024 Solo exhibition, Il Lee: 4 Paintings, Art Projects International, New York
- 2023 Solo exhibition, Il Lee: Drawing Nature's Vital Force Art Projects International, New York
- 2018 Solo exhibition, Il Lee: The 90s, Art Projects International, New York
- 2018 Group exhibition, La Collection BIC, CENTQUATRE-PARIS, Paris, France
- 2017 Solo exhibition, Suddenly a Knife: New Paintings by Il Lee, Art Projects International, New York
- 2016 Solo exhibition, Il Lee: New Paintings / 40 Years in New York, Art Projects International, New York
- 2016 Group exhibition, First Hand: Architects, Artists, and Designers from the L. J. Cella Collection, Palm Springs Art Museum, Calif.
- 2014: Group exhibition, Momentum: An Experiment in the Unexpected, San Jose Museum of Art, Calif.
- 2013: Group exhibition, Extreme Drawing – Ballpoint Pen Drawing Since 1950, The Aldrich Contemporary Art Museum, Ridgefield, Conn.
- 2013 Group exhibition, The Moment for Ink, San Francisco State University Art Gallery, Calif.
- 2012 Solo exhibition, Il Lee and The Line of Duration, Gallery Hyundai, Seoul, South Korea
- 2012 Group exhibition, 11th National Drawing Invitational: New York, Singular Drawings, Arkansas Arts Center, Little Rock, Ark.
- 2011: Group exhibition, Representation/Abstraction in Korean Art, The Metropolitan Museum of Art, New York. Two works by Il Lee featured along with works from the museum's permanent collection in a special installation; November, 2010 through March, 2011.

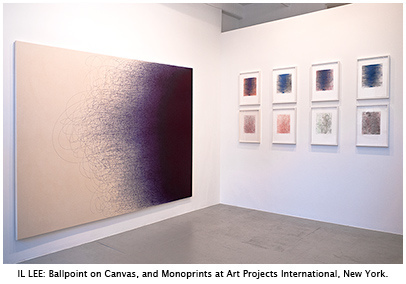
IL LEE's artwork exhibited at Art Projects International, New York (2011).

- 2011 Group exhibition, Abstract It!, National Museum of Art, Deoksugung, Seoul, South Korea
- 2011: Solo exhibition, IL LEE: Monoprints, Editions and Paintings at Art Projects International, New York. Four monoprints first shown in this exhibition were acquired by The Metropolitan Museum of Art for their permanent collection in 2012.
- 2010: Solo exhibition, New Vision – Ballpoint Drawings by IL LEE, Crow Collection of Asian Art, Dallas, Texas
- 2008: Solo exhibition, Il Lee, The Vilcek Foundation, New York.
- 2007: Solo exhibition, Il Lee: Ballpoint Drawings, Queens Museum of Art, New York
- 2007: Retrospective, Il Lee: Ballpoint Abstractions, San Jose Museum of Art, Calif.
- 2004: Group Exhibition, Open House: Working in Brooklyn, Brooklyn Museum, New York
- 2003 Group exhibition, Marking: Drawings by Contemporary Artists from Korea, Korea Society, New York
- 1997 Solo exhibition, IL Lee: Line and Form, Drawings 1984-1996, Art Projects International, New York
- 1981 Group exhibition, Korean Drawing Now, Brooklyn Museum, New York

== Collections ==
Il Lee's artwork is represented in major museum and public collections.

- Metropolitan Museum of Art, New York
- Minneapolis Institute of Art (Mia)
- San Jose Museum of Art, Calif.
- Los Angeles County Museum of Art (LACMA)
- Palm Springs Art Museum, Calif.
- The Vilcek Foundation, New York
- Nerman Museum of Contemporary Art, Kansas
- National Museum of Modern and Contemporary Art, Gwacheon, South Korea
- Leeum Samsung Museum of Art, Seoul, South Korea
- Total Museum of Contemporary Art, Seoul, South Korea
- Duksung Women's University, Seoul, South Korea
- Hongik University, Seoul, South Korea
- Hanlim Museum, Daejeon, South Korea
- Société Bic, Clichy, France
