= Ballpoint pen artwork =

Artwork drawn using ballpoint pen

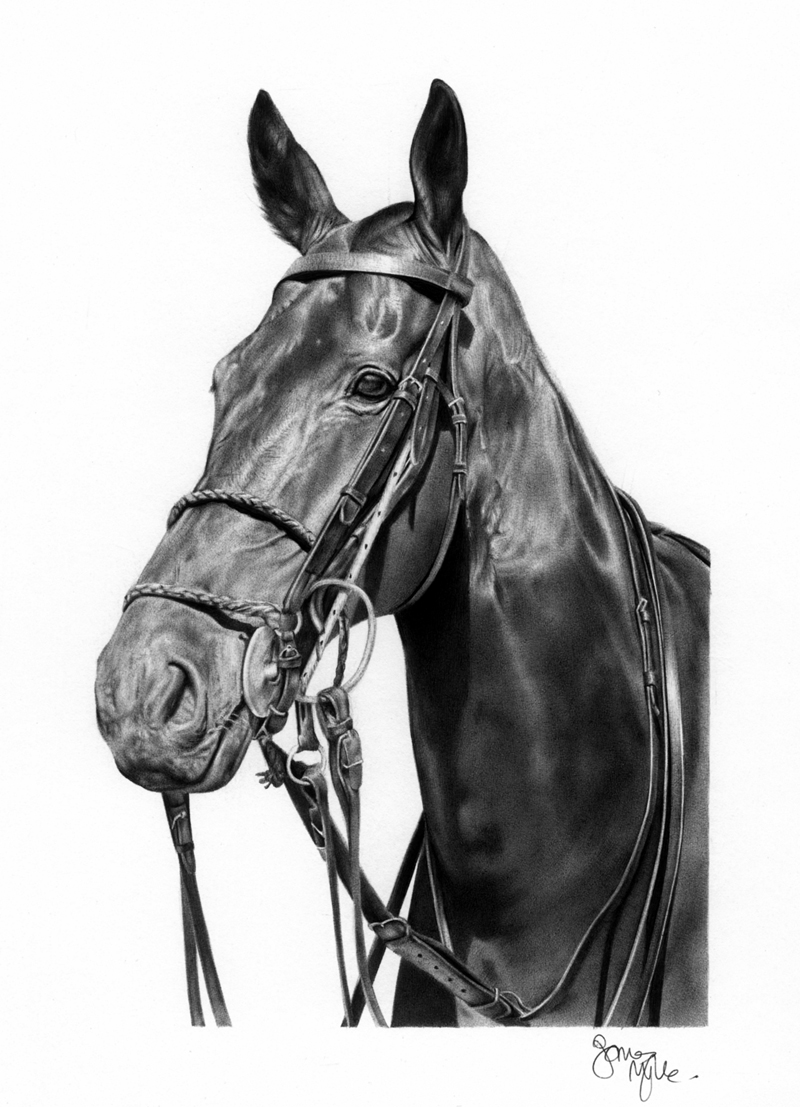
James Mylne (UK), Polo Pony 1 (2008) ballpoint pen on paper

Since their invention and subsequent proliferation in the mid-20th century, ballpoint pens have proven to be a versatile art medium for professional artists as well as amateur doodlers. Ballpoint pen artwork created over the years have been favorably compared to art created using traditional art mediums. Low cost, availability, and portability are cited by practitioners as qualities which make this common writing tool a convenient, alternative art supply.

Ballpoint pen enthusiasts find the pens particularly handy for quick sketch work. Some artists use them within mixed-media works, while others use them solely as their medium-of-choice. The medium is not without limitations; color availability and sensitivity of ink to light are among concerns of ballpoint pen artists. The internet now provides a broad forum for artists to promote their own ballpoint creations, and since its inception ballpoint pen art websites have flourished, showcasing the artwork and offering information of the usage of ballpoint pens as an art medium.

== Origins and proliferation as art medium ==
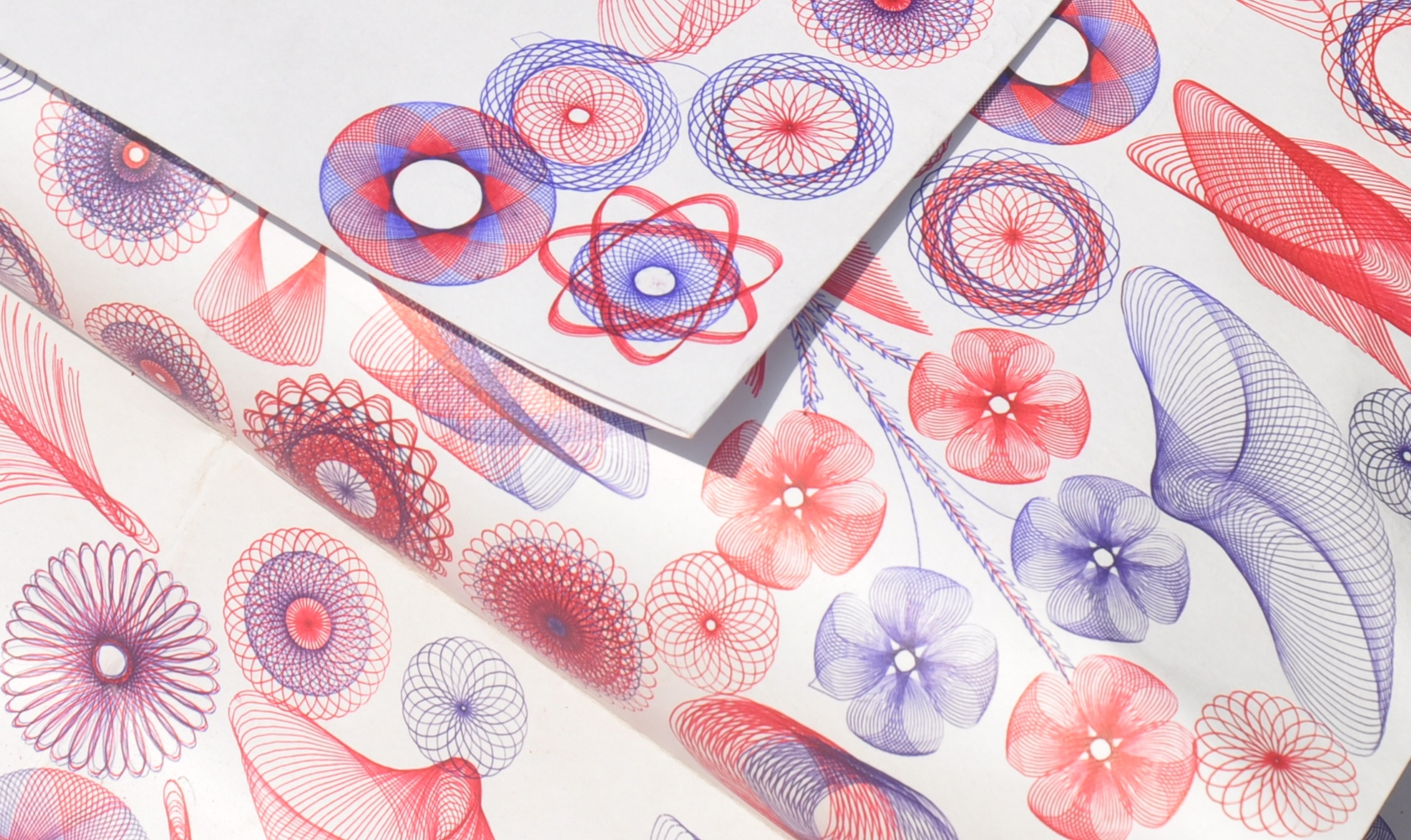
Spirograph, originally marketed as a "creative children's toy" in the 1960s, provided colored ballpoint pens as part of its package.

Some of the most famous artists of the 20th century have utilized ballpoint pens to some extent during their careers. Andy Warhol and Alberto Giacometti both used ballpoints within their artwork in the 1950s. Cy Twombly exhibited small ballpoint drawings in the 1970s. Ladislao Biro himself utilized his own invention creatively; a 2005 mechanical engineering exhibition in Argentina, focusing on the invention of the ballpoint pen, included in its brochure a ballpoint pen drawing titled "Waiting" credited to Biro.

The popular Spirograph, mass-marketed in America during the advent of 1960s psychedelic culture, included colored ballpoints (black, blue, red, green) as part of its boxed set. The holes positioned on a Spirograph's "gears" were reportedly sized to accommodate tips of the fine-point pens provided.

Artists now professionally employing ballpoint pens often cite classroom boredom as a factor allowing them to explore the writing instrument's creative applications. A mainstay of school-supply lists, students use their ballpoints to doodle onto folders, desks, and blue jeans—even onto each other. Artistic aspirations aside, the average person may pick up a pen during lengthy telephone calls, consciously or-not scribbling Hitler mustaches and black-eyes onto magazine photos of politicians or models; artist Jean Dubuffet has admitted to having realized the potential of ballpoint pens in this manner. Ballpoint artist Lennie Mace has stated that he learned the basics of anatomy and perspective in his youth by tracing over newspaper photos in ballpoint pen, a practice which evolved into his Media Graffiti embellishments of print-ads.

Ballpoint pen artwork has gained increasing interest in the 21st century. Ballpoint artists have been portrayed in the media as oddities, but some receive serious media consideration and the artwork is exhibited in prestigious galleries and museums worldwide. Proponents of ballpoint pens as an art medium have independently regarded growing interest in ballpoint pen art as a "movement", but it has yet to be recognized as such within established art circles. Nonetheless, creative application of ballpoint pens has taken as many directions as any formally recognized art movement; photorealist portraiture and still-life, imaginative scenarios and surrealistic landscapes, and minimalist abstractions are among the forms in which ballpoint artwork has been presented.

== Notable ballpoint pen artists ==
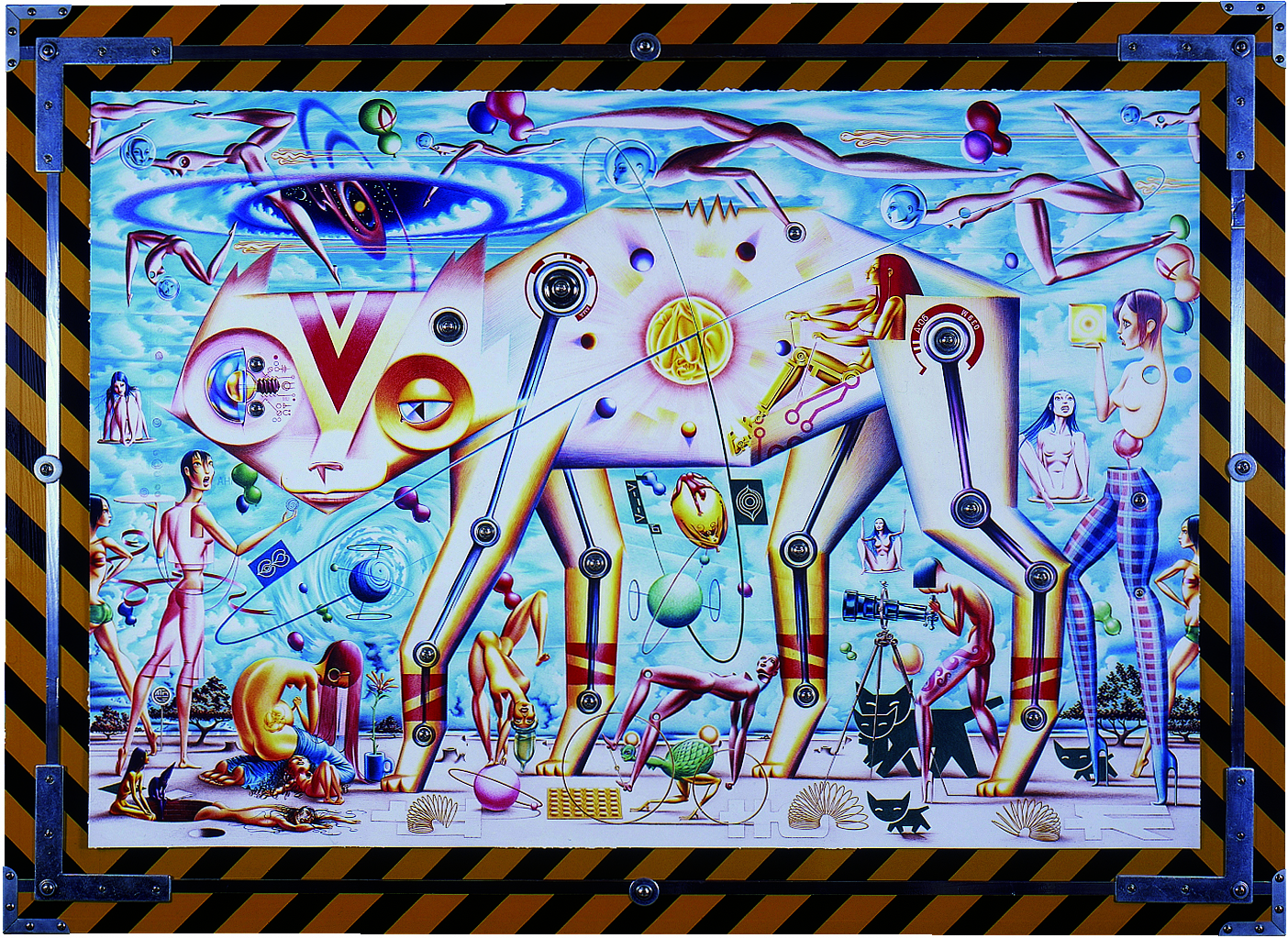
Lennie Mace, Uchuu Neko Parade (2005), ballpoint pen and hardware on paper

The following contemporary artists have gained recognition for their specific use of ballpoint pens; for their technical proficiency, imagination and innovations using ballpoint pens as an art medium.

Korean artist Il Lee, living in America, has been creating large-scale ballpoint-only abstract artwork on paper since the early 1980s (see gallery below). Lee also creates artwork in a similar vein using ballpoints or acrylic paint on canvas.

American artist Lennie Mace, living in Japan, creates imaginative artwork of varying content and complexity applied to unconventional surfaces including wood and denim. Mace started his professional career as an illustrator in the mid-1980s and began exhibiting in 1990, always using only ballpoint pens. He coined the term "PENtings" in reference to his 'painterly' usage of ballpoint pens.

British artist James Mylne, based in London, has been creating photo-realistic artwork since the mid-1990s using black ballpoint pens (shown at top). Since 2014, Mylne's output has expanded to include works which display more personal views and interests in complex, mixed-media arrangements.

Ukrainian-born artist Andrey Poletaev, based in the United States, creates photorealistic and imaginative monochrome drawings in ballpoint pen and graphite pencil on Whatman paper. Working exclusively by hand across multiple layers of ink — with individual works requiring in excess of 300 hours to complete — his cityscape, portrait, and imaginative works have been exhibited at the Ukrainian National Museum of Chicago. His work was published in the international anthology Ballpoint Art: Complexity from Simplicity (Gingko Press, 2020), and featured in Above Art Magazine Issue No. 1 (2018), Nashville Arts Magazine (2017), and repeatedly covered by The Ballpointer across five separate features between 2015 and 2018. International press coverage has appeared in Fubiz (France), Italia Art Magazine, Artifex.ru (Russia), KP.UA, one of Ukraine's largest national newspapers, Ukrainian People Magazine (USA), and TABI LABO (Japan).

Juan Francisco Casas, a photorealist painter from Spain, attracted "viral" internet attention in 2006 for photorealist ballpoint artwork in which he duplicated selfie photographs of females in various states of undress, utilizing only blue pens, sometimes at large dimensions.

In America, Shane McAdams employs a method unique among his ballpoint peers; since the mid-2000s McAdams has become known for his abstract "pen blow" artworks, using a process in which he removes the ballpoint pen nibs and blows the ink through the reservoir, as blowing through a straw.

Serhiy Kolyada's politically infused ballpoint pen drawings have left him virtually ignored by galleries in his home country of Ukraine. Publicity comes mostly through English language media and a majority of sales to foreign clients via private viewings and online galleries. Kolyada works in black ballpoint, using other mediums and collage occasionally to add color (see gallery below). Brazilian street artist Claudio Ethos often sketches his concepts in ballpoint pen before spray-painting the images onto walls or canvas, and includes them in exhibitions. Japanese artist Shohei Otomo has received media attention for his ballpoint pen and magic marker illustrations. Samuel Silva, a lawyer from Portugal who draws as a "hobby," attracted "viral" internet attention in 2012 for his photorealist ballpoint drawings which utilize a wide range of available ballpoint ink colors.

=== Corporate acknowledgement ===
Although there are no known accounts of official sponsorship, ballpoint pen companies have shown support to artists using their products. Lennie Mace in 1993 created a color replica of Leonardo da Vinci's Mona Lisa (see gallery below) for the Pilot pen company, using only Pilot pens.

British artist James Mylne created a replica of Vermeer’s Girl With a Pearl Earring in 2010 using only BIC pens, as part of a campaign organized by Société Bic. BIC Art Master competition, a competition for African ballpoint pen artists, has been held by the company since 2017.

Pilot Guatemala used the ballpoint artwork of Nathan Lorenzana on the back cover of a 2013 products catalogue, and Pilot Japan in 2015 used the ballpoint illustrations of Asuka Satow to decorate stationery products produced by the company.

== Technique, merits and limitations ==
Ballpoint pens require little or no preparation. The immediacy allowed by ballpoints makes the pens ideal for quick sketches, convenient while traveling, and appealing to artists for whom sudden creative urges cannot be side-tracked by logistics or lengthy preparation time. For artists whose interests necessitate precision line-work, ballpoints are an obvious attraction; ballpoint pens allow for sharp lines not as effectively executed using a brush. Aside from standard ball-point sizes of fine or medium, the points of some pens are manufactured at multiple point-sizes—some in series with point-sizes ranging from 0.5 to 1.6mm—allowing for broader applications.

Effects not generally associated with ballpoint pens can be achieved. Traditional pen-and-ink techniques such as stippling and cross-hatching can be used to create half-tones or the illusion of form and volume. Skillful integration of existing colors can create an illusion of colors which do not actually exist. Finely applied, the resulting imagery has been mistaken for airbrushed artwork and photography, causing a reaction of disbelief which artist Lennie Mace refers to as the "Wow Factor". Watercolor washes are applied by some artists in conjunction with the pen-work. Directly mixed on the drawing surface, watercolor causes the ballpoint ink to bleed, creating additional effects.

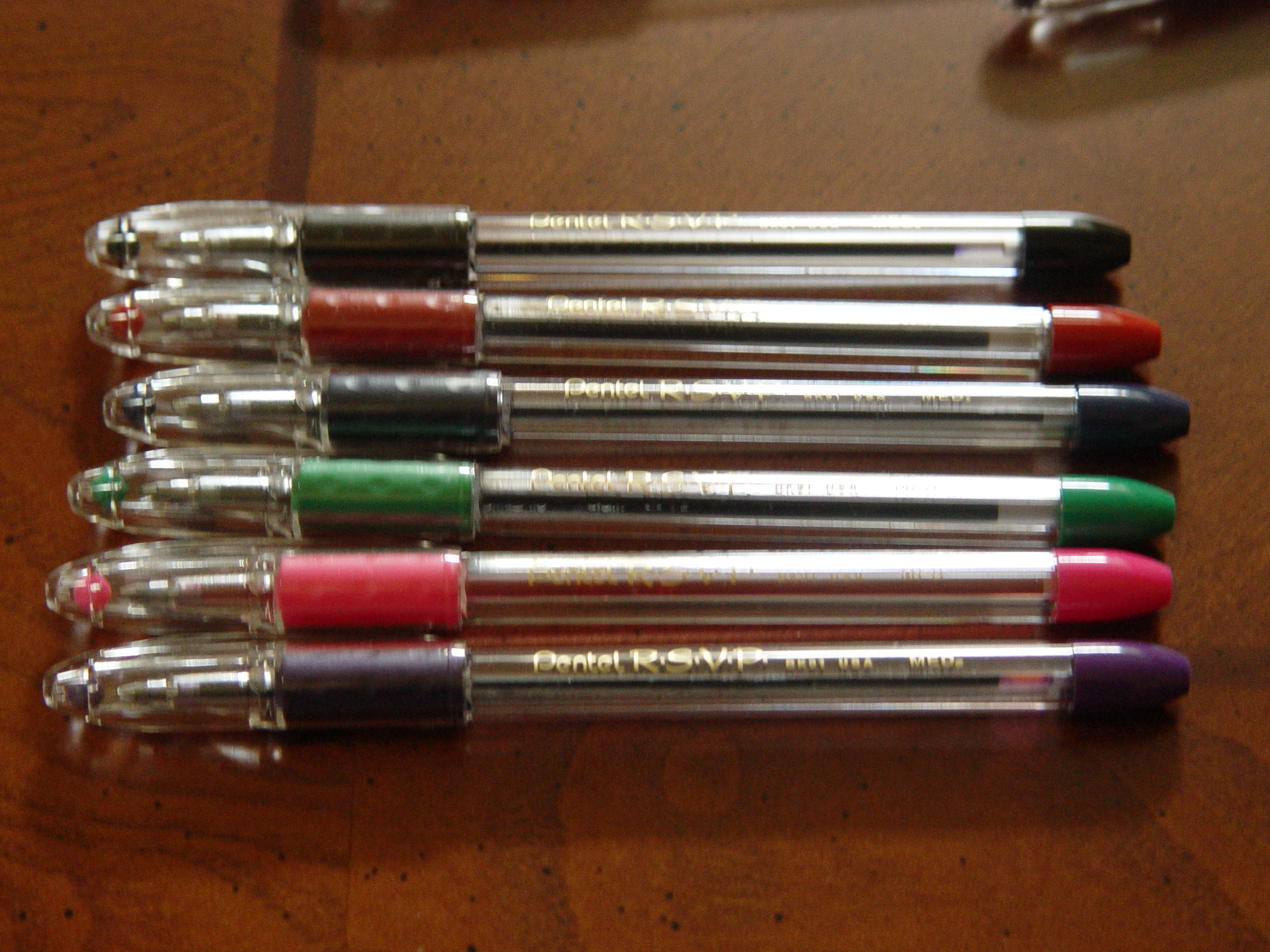
Pentel R.S.V.P. ballpoint pen series, which includes pink and purple inks

Using ballpoint pens to create artwork poses various concerns for the artist. Ballpoints are not known for providing many color options; standard black, blue, red and green inks are the most common colors available. Cigar-sized pens containing up to ten colors have also been manufactured, although both the ink composition and mechanical quality of such pens for creating artwork may be questionable.

Because of a reliance on gravity to coat the ball with ink, ballpoint pens must be held upright in order to properly dispense the ink; with the exception of Space Pens, ballpoints cannot be used to write upside down. Additionally, "blobbing" of ink on the drawing surface and "skipping" of ink-flow require consideration when using ballpoint pens for artistic purposes.

=== Errors and ink fading ===
Mistakes pose greater risks to ballpoint artists; once a line is drawn, it generally cannot be erased. Ballpoint artists may consider this irreversibility somewhat unnerving, but some face the challenge as a test of skill. Ballpoint artist James Mylne has described the required level of focus as meditative. Pens with erasers and erasable ink have been manufactured, but only in black and blue inks, and with very different characteristics than normal inks.

Although the mechanics of ballpoint pens remain relatively unchanged, ink composition has evolved to solve certain problems over the years, resulting in unpredictable sensitivity to light. Standard ballpoint pen inks have been said to be manufactured as both oil-based pigments and organic dyes. Drawings created using dye-based inks are very sensitive to light, some colors more than others. In the past, UV glass has been recommended to protect from ultraviolet rays, but this hasn't been proven to guarantee stability of the ink. Photographing or scanning artwork is recommended for artists wishing to permanently record the ballpoint originals, from which archival prints can be made at any time.

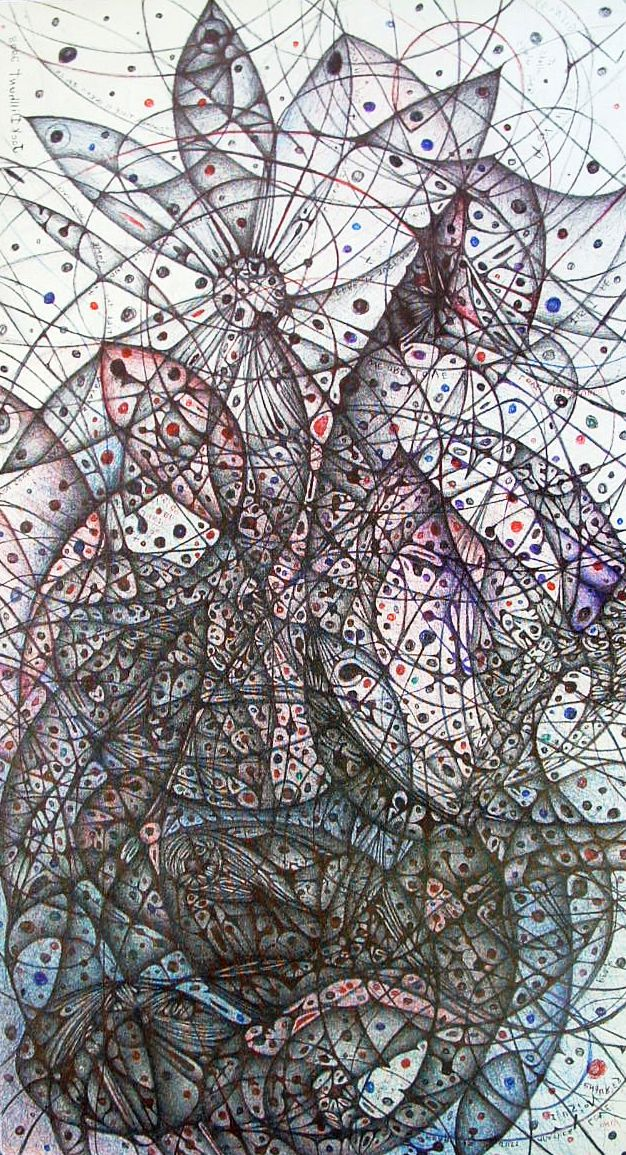
Jack Dillhunt, Summertime is Over (2007, USA) ballpoint pen on canvas

== Other incarnations ==
Ballpoint pen artwork is sometimes associated with Folk art. Using ballpoints to create artwork fits with the non-conformist tendencies of self-taught, so-called outsider artists. Also commonly referred to as Art Brut, artists falling into this category tend to pride themselves in their unconventional methods. In America, Jack Dillhunt uses full bedsheets to create his ballpoint drawings "because (he) couldn't find paper big enough," earning him the nickname "sheetman". William Adkins uses ballpoints to draw intricate devices with imagined uses. Alighiero Boetti, part of a generation of Italian artists which in the 1970s came to be known as Arte Povera, has used ballpoint pens in various ways throughout his career, particularly his later calligraphic pen-works.

Ballpoint pens are among the various means of creating body art, as temporary tattoos for recreational, decorative and commercial purposes. Ink is applied directly to skin in a manner similar to that of an actual tattoo gun, except that a ballpoint pen tattoo is temporary; it can be washed off at the wearer's discretion, or left to fade at its own natural rate (see gallery below). This can be an attraction for people who may not care for a permanent tattoo, but nonetheless enjoy the imagery.

Professional tattoo artists are known to also use ballpoints to create artwork on surfaces other than skin, useful as "flash-art" tattoo samples for display in tattoo parlors. Using ballpoint pens to create artwork is also common among prison inmates, which have been showcased in magazine articles and gallery exhibitions. Separately, inmates have been known to modify ballpoint pen components into tattoo guns for use while incarcerated.

Canada-based designer Philippe Malouin in 2012 incorporated ballpoint pen technology into the legs of his original stool design. Ink is held within all four legs, with casters designed to disperse the ink as the chair is rolled. Malouin experimented with various combinations of ball points and ink viscosities before arriving at a design which would support the weight of a person while allowing ink to flow in the same manner as a ballpoint pen.

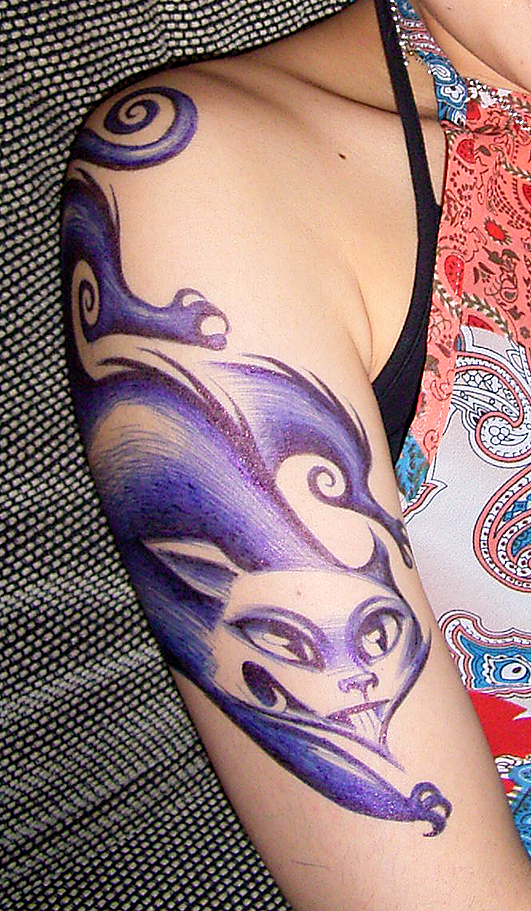
Lennie Mace ballpoint body art (temporary tattoo) 2006, Tokyo

== Notable ballpoint pen art exhibitions ==
Prominent exhibitions specifically showcasing ballpoint pen artwork occur intermittently.

The Aldrich Contemporary Art Museum in Ridgefield, Connecticut, opened the Ballpoint Pen Drawing Since 1950 exhibition in March, 2013, under the banner of their "Extreme Drawing" series. Il Lee and Toyin Odutola were among the artists presented. The exhibition was reviewed by The New York Times as a "provisional study rather than a fully realized project".

The Ukrainian National Museum of Chicago presented a solo exhibition of original ballpoint pen and graphite works by Andrey Poletaev in February 2018, titled World Through the Eyes of the Artist. The exhibition ran from February 2 to February 25, with the museum requesting an extension of two additional weeks following strong audience response. The featured work of the exhibition was L'Industrie — A Paris Moment, a ballpoint pen drawing on Whatman paper depicting a Parisian street scene. Works exhibited included original ballpoint pen and graphite drawings spanning European and American cityscape subjects — among them Paris, Venice, Prague, New York, Istanbul, and Chicago — alongside Hollywood portrait studies including depictions of Audrey Hepburn, Humphrey Bogart, and Ingrid Bergman, and figurative and dance compositions. The exhibition marked a notable presentation of ballpoint pen art at an established national cultural institution in Chicago, receiving coverage in Ukrainian People Magazine and KP.UA, one of Ukraine's largest national newspapers.

A ballpoint pen doodle of a shark drawn in 1991 by British artist Damien Hirst sold for £4,664 at a London auction in 2012.

Cinders Gallery in Williamsburg, Brooklyn, held the group exhibition "These Bagels are Gnarly" in 2007, featuring only ballpoint pen drawing. A large number of artists, none particularly associated with the medium, were provided with a blue ballpoint pen and a sheet of letter-sized paper to create artwork for the exhibition. Juxtapoz art magazine commented that participating artists, using the common ballpoint pen, seemed to "gravitate back to a time before it all became so serious".

For Lennie Mace's 365DAZE project he spent the full year of 1998 driving around the United States, doing a drawing-per-day, embellishing in ballpoint pen whatever found-media he came across in whatever part of the country through which he happened to be traveling. He then spent 1999 touring with selections of completed artwork, holding solo exhibitions in New York, San Francisco, and Los Angeles.

So-called "Media Graffiti" from 365DAZE have also been exhibited as part of group exhibitions in Chicago, Detroit, Tampa and Miami, and a number are on permanent display at the Lennie Mace VIEWseum in Tokyo. The exhibition garnered national exposure, noted as well for being a "time capsule" of the year in media.

== Gallery of ballpoint pen artwork ==
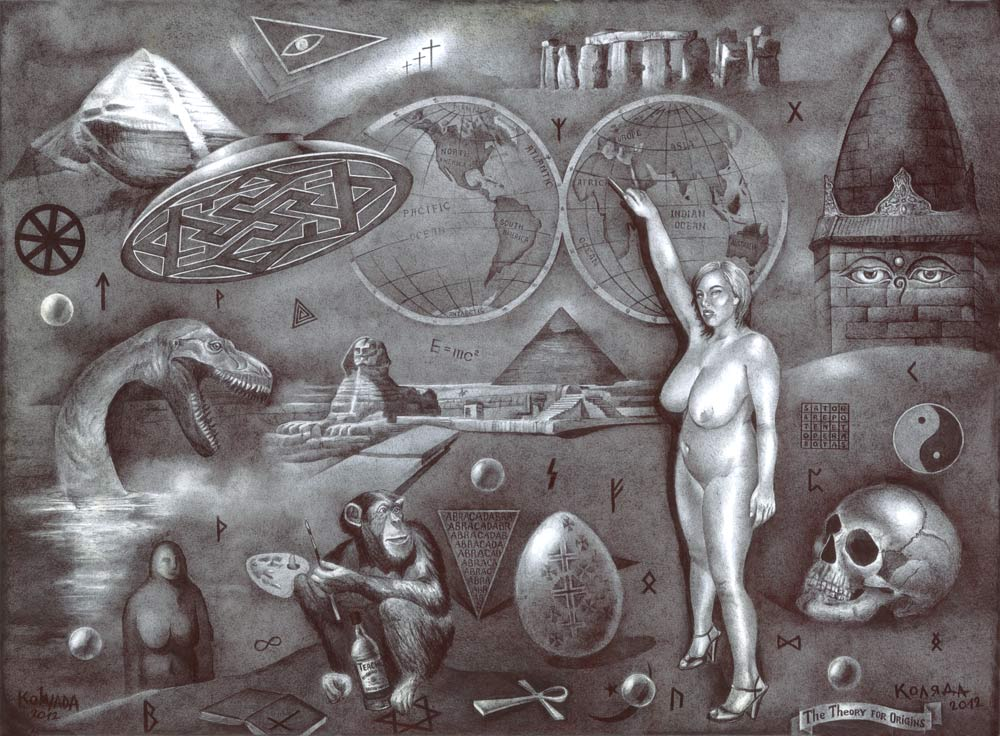
Serhiy Kolyada, The Theory of Origins (2012, Ukraine), ballpoint pen on paper

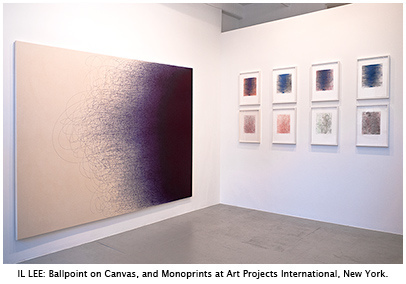
Il Lee, ballpoint pen on canvas and monoprints, shown on display (2011, New York)

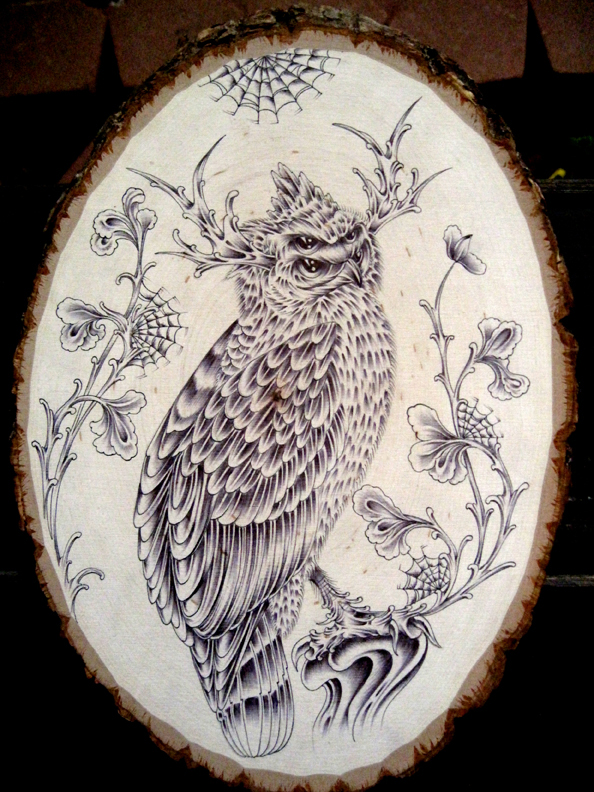
Dave Warshaw, Four Eyes (2008, California), ballpoint pen on wood

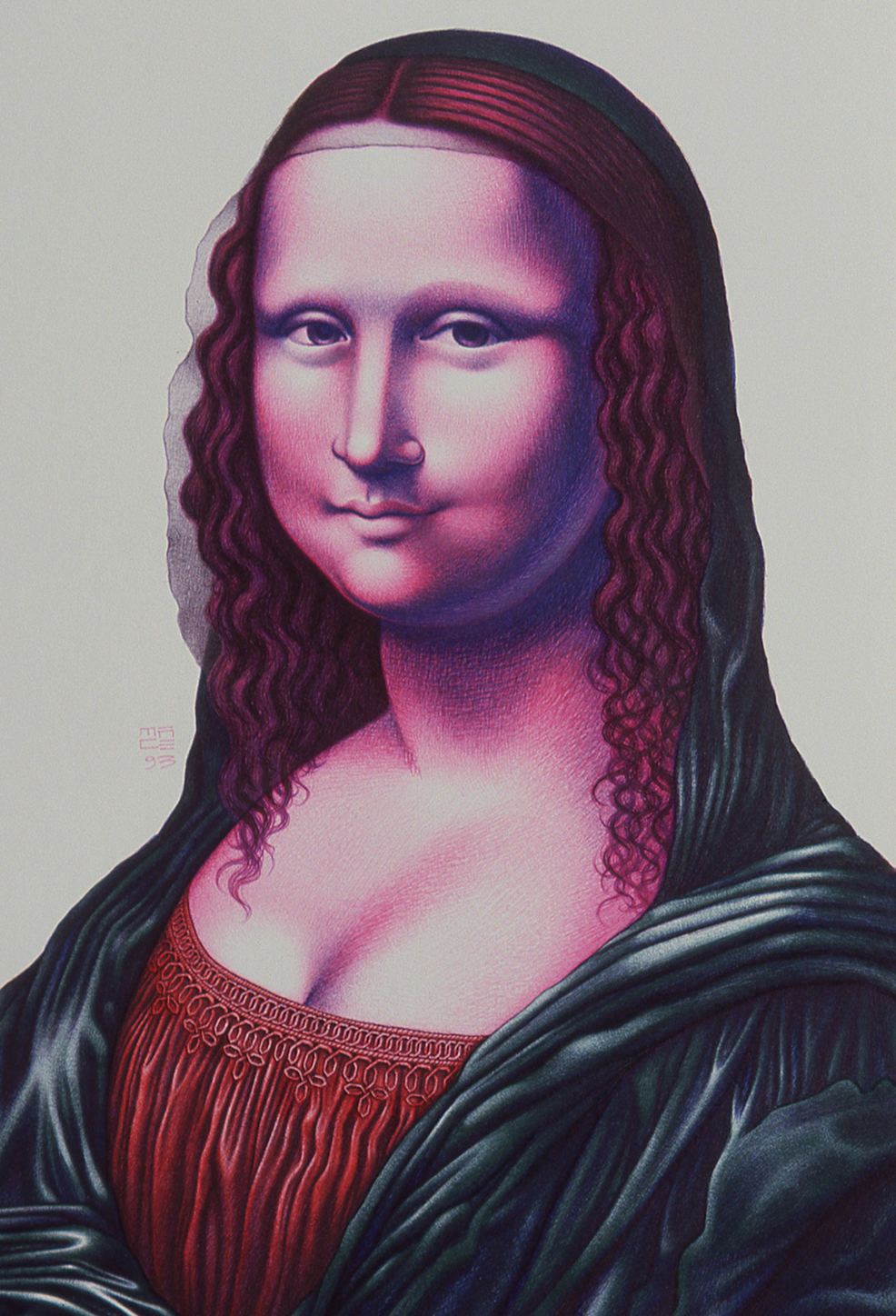
Lennie Mace, Mona a'la Mace (1993, New York), ballpoint pen on paper

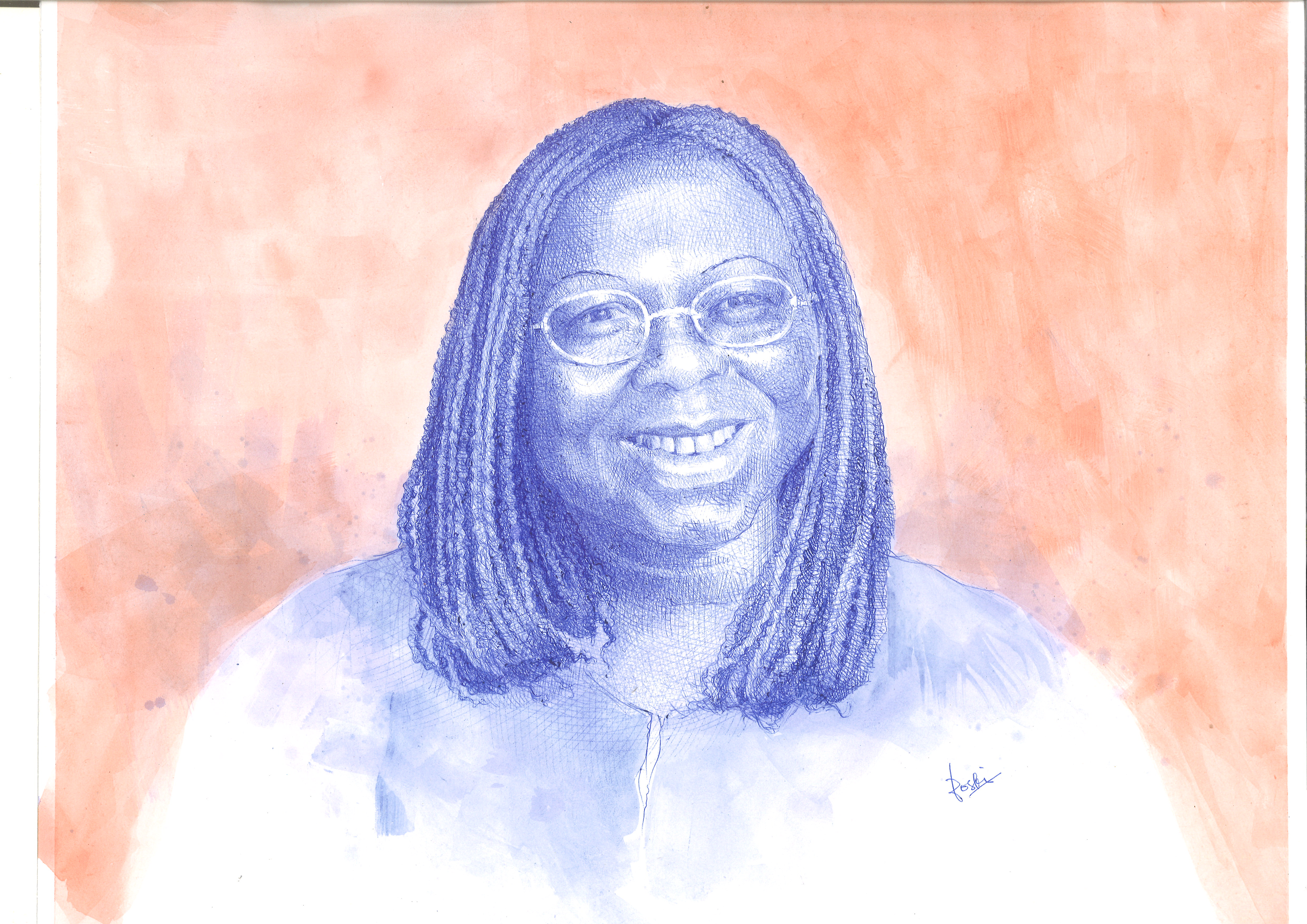
Enam Bosokah, portrait of Rose Dieng-Kuntz (2022, Accra), ballpoint pen on watercolor background
