= James Mylne (artist) =

British contemporary artist (born 1981)

- Born: 5 May 1981 (age 45); London, England
- Education: B.A. Drawing; M.A., 2006
- Known for: fine art and illustration drawn in ballpoint pen, mixed-media
- Website: jamesmylne.co.uk

James Mylne is a British contemporary artist known for his drawings in ballpoint pen. His technical abilities with the unorthodox art medium have earned Mylne recognition in Europe and the UK. The Ballpointer online journal called Mylne "Britain's premier ballpoint pen artist" in a 2015 feature article. The artist's photorealist likenesses of iconic celebrities attracted early media attention and continues to be one aspect of his output. Mylne also creates mixed-media works adding spray paint, magic markers and more to his ballpoint originals. Artwork expressing personal views and broader interests flourished throughout 2014.

== Art education ==
James Mylne attended foundation courses at Chelsea Art College, London, in 2002. Studies there were followed by 3 years at Camberwell, where he received his BA in drawing in 2005 and his MA in 2006. College instructors were unsupportive of his ballpoint usage, and dismissed his work as "pretty pictures".

=== Ballpoint usage ===
As with many other bored students — artists or not — Mylne doodled in biro (as ballpoint pens are known in the UK) during secondary school. Although he has spoken of original aspirations to be a painter and was still painting at the age of 18, James had already begun giving ballpoint pens greater consideration as an art medium since he was 16, or "around 1996". By his college years, prior to widespread popularity of the internet, Mylne was still approaching his ballpoint pen usage as if he were the only one using them to create art, ignorant of anyone else using them.

Of his choice of ballpoints as a preferred medium, Mylne credits the pen's capabilities of precision and distinct contrast. Such "technical" aspects of the medium have interested him most, in part fueling his desire "to master ballpoint photorealism". Mylne has said that biros appeal to him because of the concentration required. Separately, he adds, "you find them everywhere."

Upon completion of formal studies, he launched a website dedicated to disseminating information of ballpoint pens as an alternative art medium. Mylne was one of the earliest of artists using ballpoint pens who exploited the internet to promote their work, which in turn attracted attention to ballpoint pens as an art medium overall. He continues to run a blog with the same purposes, and his ongoing YouTube contributions have attracted a following.

== Art career ==
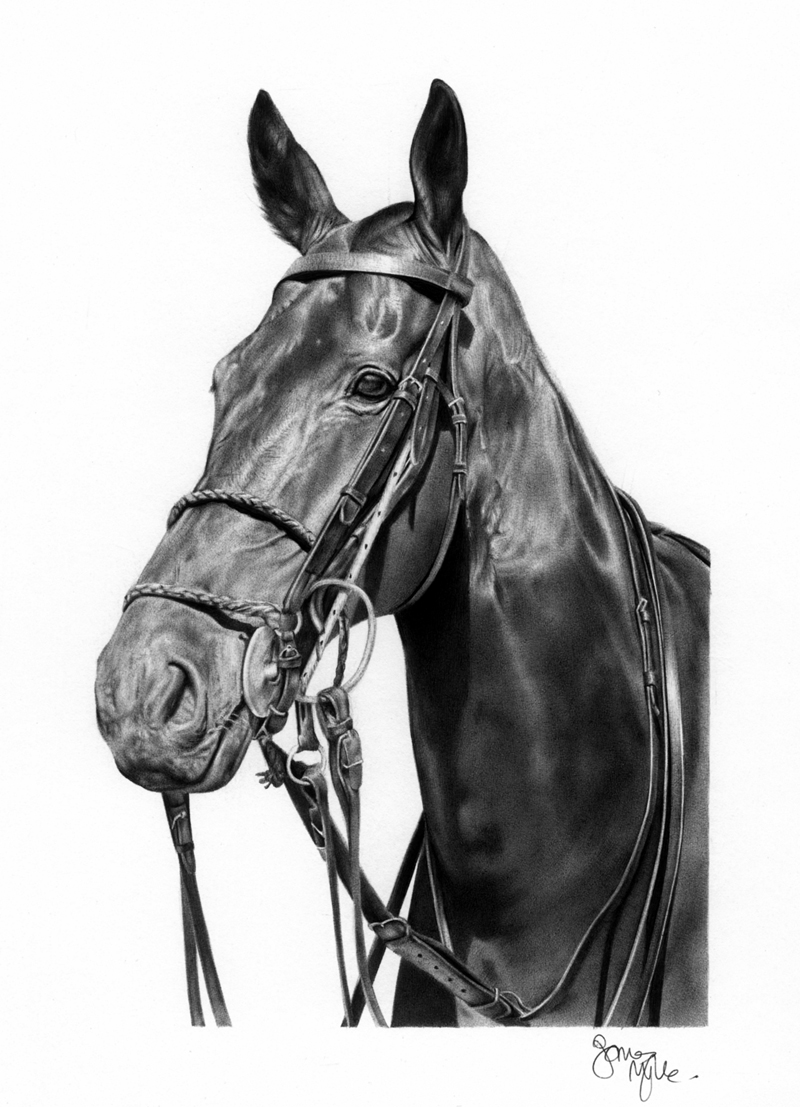
Polo Pony 1; 2008, ballpoint pen on paper, 20 x 30cm

England's BBC London News program reported in a 2014 interview that James Mylne sold his first work of art when he was nineteen years old. Exhibitions of his ballpoint drawings began in 2001. In his photorealistic artworks, subject matter has included wildlife (shown at right), urban landscapes and the female form. Mylne's ballpoint pen replicas of iconic photos of entertainers and artists from Britain and America, including Audrey Hepburn and Jean-Michel Basquiat, were the first to attract attention. Hepburn became a recurring "muse".

Kate Moss' visage has also appeared prominently in James Mylne's artwork. Two of the artist's photorealistic ballpoint likenesses of Moss were chosen as art magazine covers, the first in 2009 and again in 2012, which also featured an interview with Mylne. One of these Kate Moss drawings reportedly required six weeks to complete.

=== 2010-2014: Vermeer replica, Reworked and Vintage Vogue exhibitions ===
James Mylne participated in a 2010 Bic Challenge campaign sponsored by the pen company, for which he created a replica of Vermeer's Girl With a Pearl Earring using a single black Bic pen as part of the challenge. He appeared on British television to discuss the artwork, noting the 90 hours of drawing spent toward its completion. The artist and his artwork received media coverage throughout Britain and internationally via the internet at the time.

Mylne participated in the first two of an exhibition series titled Reworked produced by Rook & Raven gallery, London, his representative at the time. As suggested by the exhibition title, a select group of artists was given a choice of photographs lensed by a featured photographer, to interpret as they wished. Terry O'Neill was the featured photographer of the inaugural Reworked exhibition in 2010. Mylne was chosen as one of six artists to collaborate with the renowned photographer for Terry O'Neill, Reworked. The artist opted for a vintage photograph of Sean Connery as his James Bond character, shot during filming of Diamonds Are Forever. Mylne used only black ballpoints, but produced a limited-edition print with additional background colour. Terry O'Neill made an appearance with the artwork (and the photograph from which it was copied) on British television, expressing amazement at the four weeks Mylne spent working on his contribution. Photographs of Mylne drawing the image also appeared in British media.

The second installment of the Reworked exhibitions was held in March 2013, featuring the photography of Bill Wyman, the bass guitarist and founding member of The Rolling Stones who was also known as an avid photographer. He was introduced to Rook & Raven by Terry O'Neill, the previously featured photographer, who'd photographed the band since their early years. Mylne was among five artists selected for Bill Wyman, Reworked, and contributed reworkings of two Wyman photos. One of Mylne's contributions was his black and white reinterpretation of a colour photo Wyman had taken of American model Jerry Hall, a former wife of bandmate Mick Jagger.

James Mylne's Vintage Vogue was his first major solo exhibition, gaining widespread publicity via the internet. The central theme of the October 2012, exhibition drew on "the elegance and style" of celebrated icons of the 1940s, 50s and 60s. Among the celebrities illustrated in this collection were Coco Chanel and Steve McQueen.

=== 2014-2015: Torn and Anti Con Art series, Microsoft digital pens ===
In what would be the first of several shifts by Mylne in 2014, the artist took new steps with his photorealism by getting involved in producing his own photo references instead of using existing photos. The results became Mylne's Torn series, debuted in his Something More exhibition. Mylne combined the photos with his matching ballpoint pen drawings, torn as if exposing different layers, emulating the way torn street posters expose older layers beneath.

In August 2014, the artist worked with Microsoft to promote the company's new Surface Pro 3 tablet and digital pen. Using the new medium, Mylne recreated some of the most famous portrait paintings in Britain's National Portrait Gallery in London, including the Chandos portrait of William Shakespeare. Mylne commented on the similarities of the two seemingly disparate technologies, calling it a "surprisingly easy transition". His digital depictions were displayed at the institution as part of the promotional campaign.

Mylne also began his Anti Con Art series in 2014, for the first time baring personal views through his artwork. As he explained in a "manifesto" released in December, Mylne felt that "contemporary art has been hijacked by an untalented, academic, self-appointed elite", and used the new series to take jabs at what he labels the "Art Mafia". Mylne justified openly expressing such views in an interview with The Ballpointer, stating "I think more people sympathize than actually condemn (such views)".

Mylne continued expressing himself more personally through his artwork into 2015. He began the year promoting his JRM Desktop series through a variety of group and pop-up exhibitions. Artwork in this series show a blend of many alternate interests, while blending ballpoint pen heavily with mixed media. Says Mylne, "I think it's not the artwork that is of value but the artist in the artwork. The artist's spirit, thoughts, concerns have to shine through the work." He also describes the series as "a nice break from the rigorously detailed portraits".

== Style & Technique ==
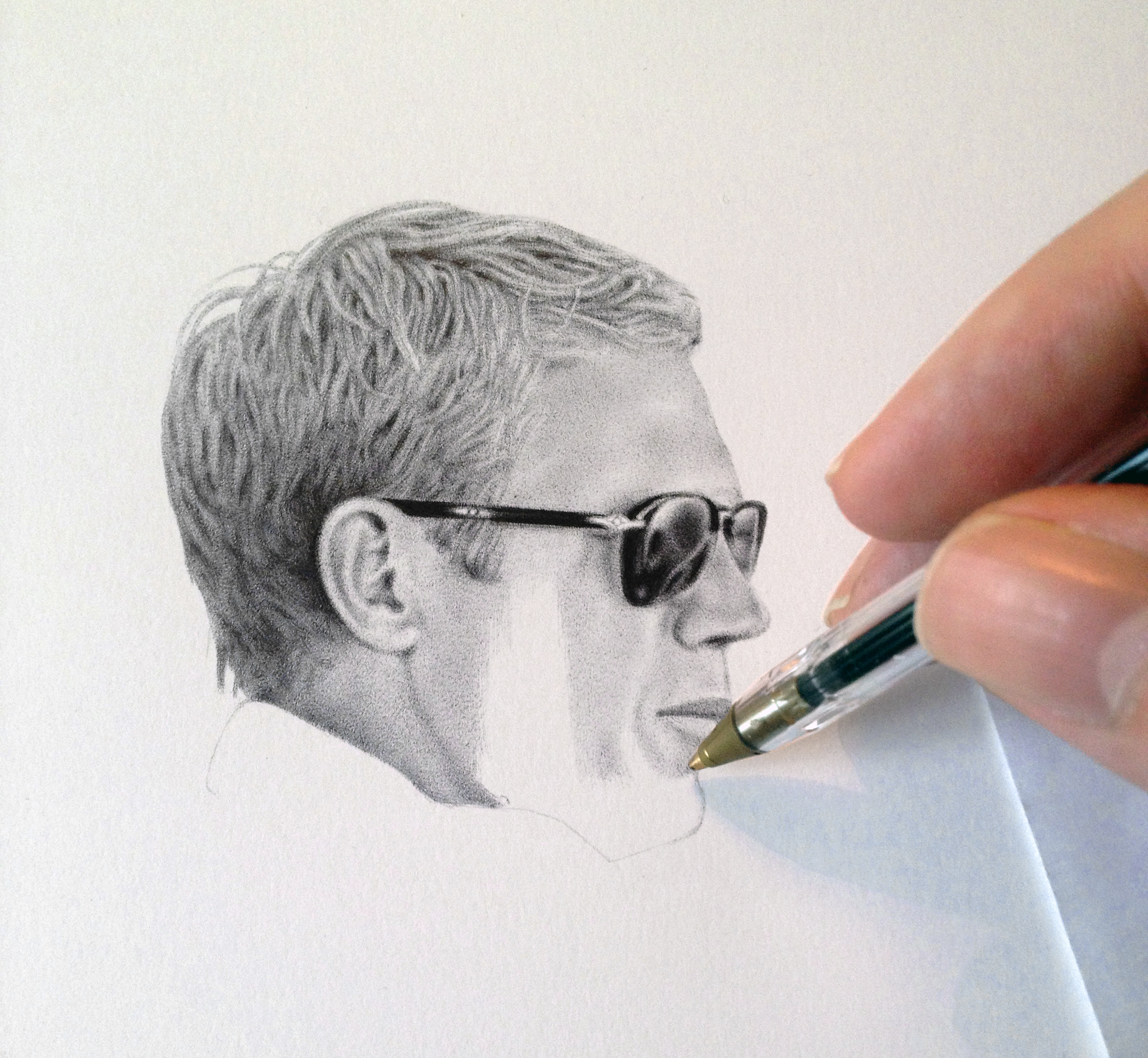
Work-in-progress, portrait of Steve McQueen, 2010

James Mylne uses only black ink when working in ballpoint pen. Regardless of the many ballpoint pen brands available, he is known to prefer the Bic "biro". To add color, Mylne employs acrylics, gouache, spray paint and paint pens. The artist finds paint pens useful for filling larger areas of black. For background color, Mylne masks off the silhouette of a figure he'll be drawing, then applies flat fields of colour using spray paint. Mylne's Anti Con Art series shows ballpoint-penned characters interacting with others painted in acrylic or gouache. To achieve this trick Mylne will simply paint around previously penned areas or leave those intended areas blank while painting, then ink them afterward.

Mylne admits to being "passionate about detail", adding that ballpoints allow for great detail and subtle halftones "if you know how to use them". Halftone effects are achieved by controlled spacing of parallel ballpoint lines while referencing his source material. During a live show-and-tell appearance on Britain's Blue Peter television program, Mylne explained that he works "very slowly", using pencil for preliminary outlines. He begins with what he perceives to be "the most difficult bit" — a person's eyes, for example — "because that's the most important bit to get right". Mylne has admitted to having to start over after making a mistake.

For the most part, Mylne finds most of his source-images online. Often, he has to "infer" details into his own drawing to compensate for loss of detail which occurs when "scaling-up" small, inferior data into larger, detailed artwork, describing the process as "almost creating a new image". For his 2014 Torn series, Mylne took an active role in the production of his photographic references, working with photographers and models.

== Media reception ==
Reaction to James Mylne's artwork has been generally favorable. Orlando Lebron, in a 2015 article for the online trade journal The Ballpointer, observed, "Many other so-called hyper-realist ballpointers' artwork rely on distance or reduction to tighten loosely hatched linework. Mylne's artwork needs no such buffer". Other reviewers have described Mylne as a "master technician", and commended the "stunning likenesses" he portrays, which "gain a lifelike presence".

Mylne's photorealist ballpoint pen artworks are so finely inked that they are often mistaken for photo prints, even when viewed up-close. Mylne has related one instance where his artwork was denied entry into a "notable" exhibition because photography was not permitted.

Dylan Jones, writing about Mylne for British GQ in 2015, both complemented and questioned the attraction of his ballpoint artwork. While on one hand stating, "when they're good they're very good indeed" and calling Mylne an "extraordinary talent", Jones also comments that "taken from famous photographs", the imagery takes on "a cheap, second-hand flavor", and cites a third-party source who stated "you're appreciating the technique rather than artistic flair".

In defense of occasional criticism about lack of depth in his work, James had previously countered that true fans of his work are "taking it at face value" and, as his work is not intended to serve any deeper purpose, he's 'fine with that'. At the same time, Mylne's output had been undergoing notable shifts throughout 2014 beyond the "straightforward" photorealism of several years earlier.

== Personal ==
Mylne acknowledges some artistic influence from street art during the early 2000s, owing to disillusionment by the sensationalism of the YBA generation prevalent at that time. Mylne used his Anti Con Art series (2014–present) to begin airing views about contemporary art and art world politics, in general.

Tibetan Buddhism is a continuing inspiration to the artist.

In 2014 Mylne parted ways with his longtime gallery. He now lists himself as "independent" of gallery representation.

== See also ==
- Terry O'Neill (photographer)
