= Enam Bosokah =

Ghanaian artist

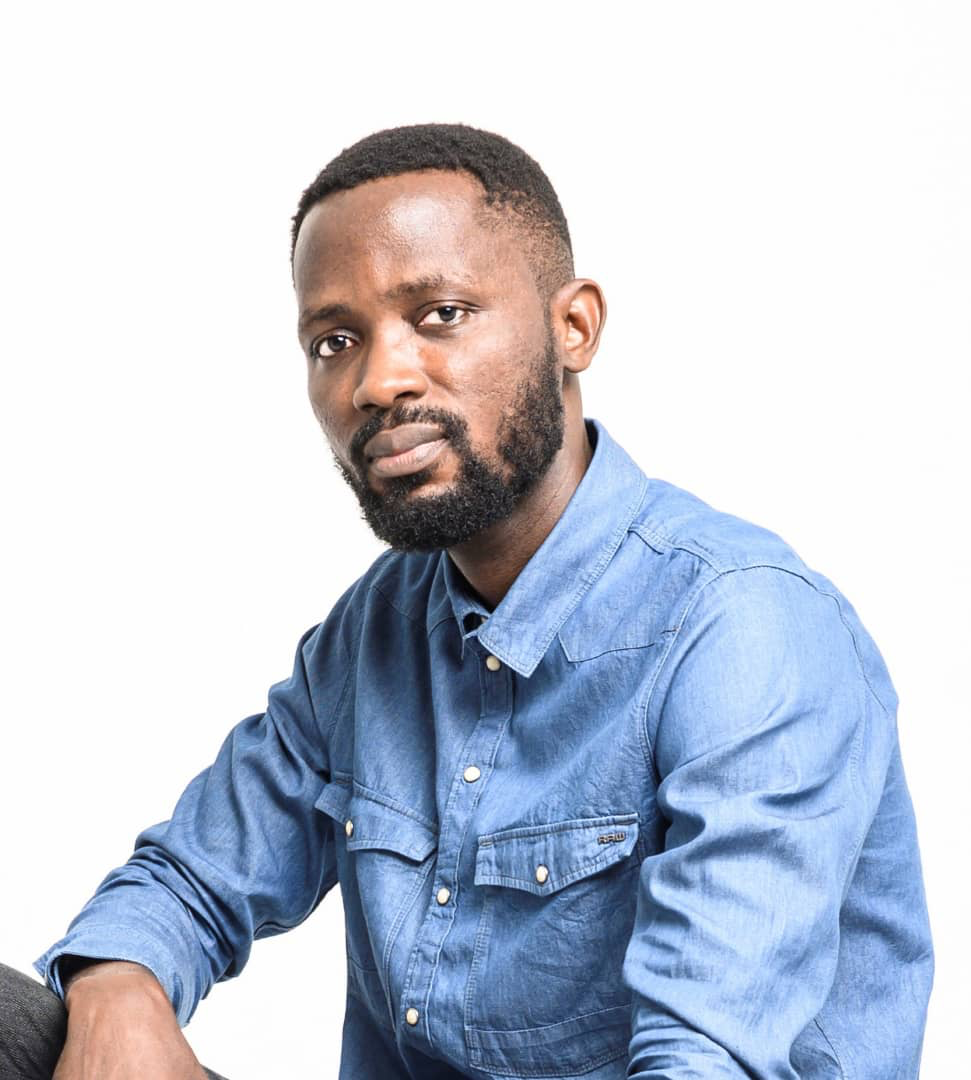
Enam Bosokah in 2021

Enam Bosokah is a Ghanaian artist. He is known for his ballpoint pen artwork.

Bosokah graduated from Kwame Nkrumah University of Science and Technology, where he studied sculpture. About his choice of medium, he says that "The pen is very economical; I don’t get to buy a lot of materials and I am good to go. My use of the pen is to prove that those things we underestimate [can create great things]." Beside the pen, he has worked in other mediums like charcoal and watercolours. His art has been exhibited in and outside Africa.

Bosokah has acted as a judge in the BIC Art Master Competition, a competition for African ball-point pen artists, held by Société Bic since 2017. He has made portraits for Wiki Unseen, a Wikimedia Foundation collaboration aimed at providing depictions for BIPOC Wikipedia biographies without an image of the subject.

As of 2022, he lives in Accra.
