= Samuel Silva =

Samuel Silva (born 1983) is a lawyer from Portugal whose ball point pen drawings received "viral" recognition in 2012. He lives and works in the United Kingdom.

== Early life and education ==
Silva was born in Portugal, and started drawing at the age of two, He continued to draw throughout his childhood and teenage years. He attended Law School and has been practicing law since 2007. He has no formal art training.

== Career ==
Silva began posting scans of his drawings on the website Deviant Art. In 2012 his realistic art created with ballpoint pens and received attention from a number of news outlets and magazines around the world, including the Toledo Free Press, the Huffington Post, the Herald, and Scientific American.

Silva's drawings are created with cross-hatching and minute detail, and are sometimes mistaken for photographs. His drawings are recreations of existing photographs.
