= Crow Museum of Asian Art =

Art museum in Dallas, Texas, U.S.

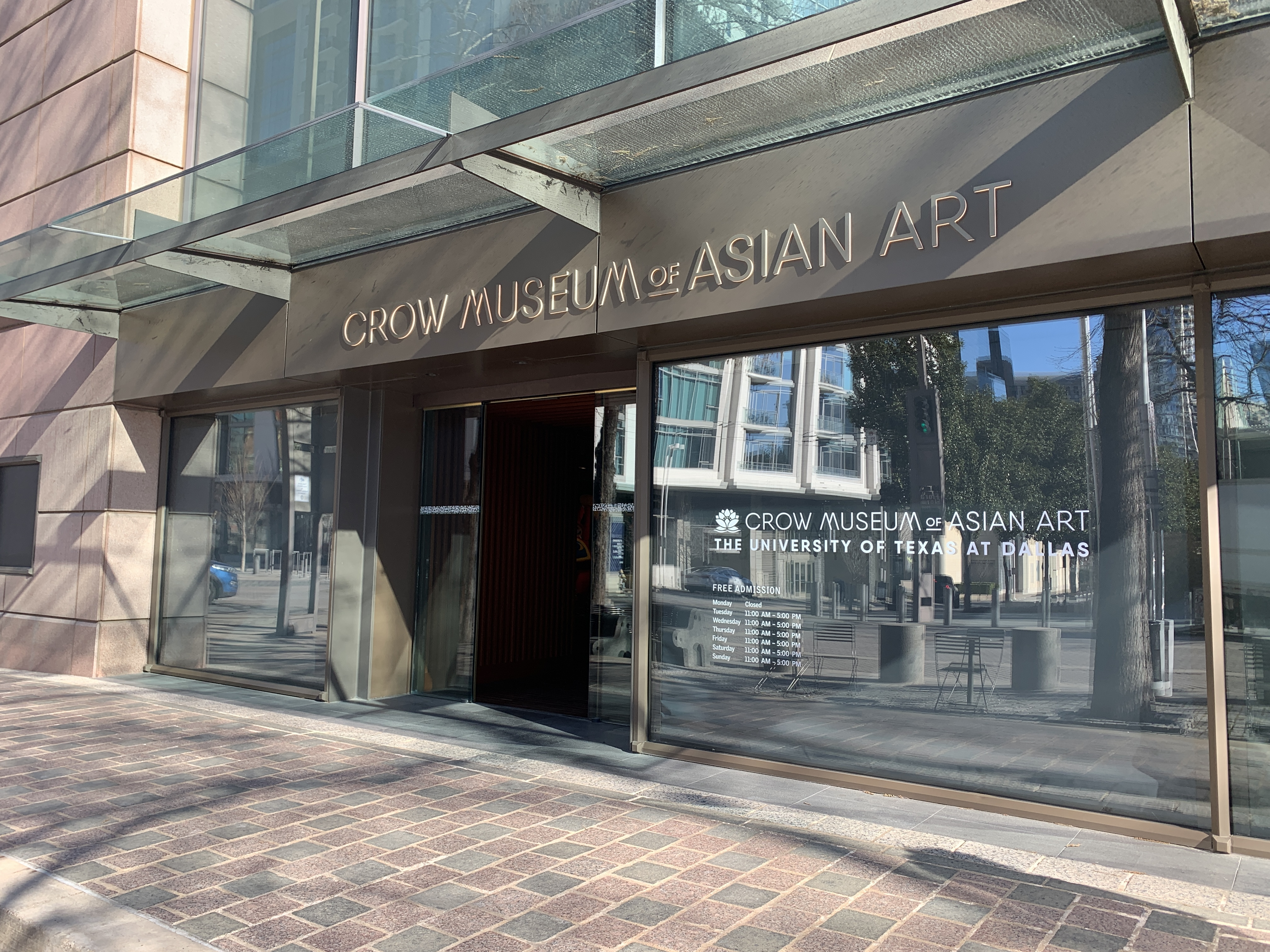
- Established: 1998
- Location: Dallas, Texas, U.S.
- Coordinates: 32.787767°N 96.799983°W
- Type: Asian art
- Collection size: Over 4,000 pieces
- Director: Amy Lewis Hofland
- President: Trammell S. Crow
- Curator: Natalia Di Pietrantonio
- Public transit access: M-Line: Olive & Ross
- Website: http://crowmuseum.org

The Crow Museum of Asian Art is a museum in Dallas, Texas, United States. It has two locations in the Dallas–Fort Worth metroplex. It is dedicated to celebrating the arts and cultures of Asia including China, Japan, India, Korea, Nepal, Vietnam, Cambodia, Thailand, Indonesia, Myanmar and the Philippines, from ancient to the contemporary. The Crow Museum opened its first location in Downtown Dallas to the public on December 5, 1998, as a gift to the people and visitors of Dallas from Mr. and Mrs. Trammell Crow. The museum is a member of the Dallas Arts District. The interior was designed by Booziotis and Company Architects of Dallas. In 2024, a second location opened on the campus of the University of Texas at Dallas.

== History ==
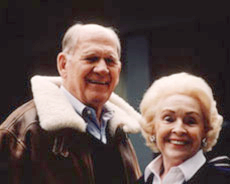
Trammell and Margaret Crow.

Trammell and Margaret Crow bought their first piece of Asian art in the mid-1960s. The Crows traveled extensively throughout the world, but Asia was a favorite destination. Pieces from Southeast Asian countries such as China, Japan, and India were added as the Crows' travels continued, evolving into a distinguished collection featuring artwork spanning 3500 B.C. to the early 20th century.

The idea for the museum came about when Mr. and Mrs. Crow decided they would like to keep the collection intact as a legacy for their children and grandchildren, and the general public. The artwork, which ranges from including examples of Chinese jades, Buddhist sculpture, and Japanese screen paintings, had been displayed in lobbies, reception, and office areas of the Trammell Crow Center, other office buildings, marts, hotels, and in the homes of the Crows and their children prior to the formation of a museum. "Because the art was scattered between commercial buildings and our families' homes, we had little notion of what kind of a collection we had until pieces were gathered for the exhaustive selection process," Mrs. Crow said.

In total, the Crow family has amassed more than 4,000 pieces of Asian art, among which the 569 best were selected, after extensive analysis, by a noted curator for inclusion in The Crow Collection. At that point, the interior of the Pavilion at the Trammell Crow Center was redesigned and renovated to meet the special needs of a gallery displaying centuries-old art year-round. A son of the family, Trammell S. Crow, serves as president of the Crow Family Foundation and oversees the development of The Crow Collection.

The Crow Museum was partially closed for the majority of 2018 as it underwent renovations and an expansion. After years of thoughtful planning and development, the museum dramatically expanded its footprint along the southwest corner of Harwood and Flora Streets in the Dallas Arts District. Oglesby Greene Architects of Dallas, which handled earlier renovations of the museum, led the expansion project. The Beck Group was the general contractor. In September 2018, the Crow Collection changed their name to the Crow Museum of Asian Art, a name that reflects not only the breadth of the collection and programming but also the museum's wide and diverse community support.

Additionally, the Crow Museum formally launched the Center for Contemplative Leadership with programming focused around The Charter for Compassion. Coupled with mindfulness-based art education programming in the museum, this initiative promotes increases awareness, productivity, and compassion for self and others through classes and workshops that explore mindfulness.

It was announced in January 2019 that the University of Texas at Dallas would acquire the museum. The deal included the establishment of a second Crow Museum location at the UT-Dallas campus in Richardson. The second location opened in 2024.

== Permanent collection ==
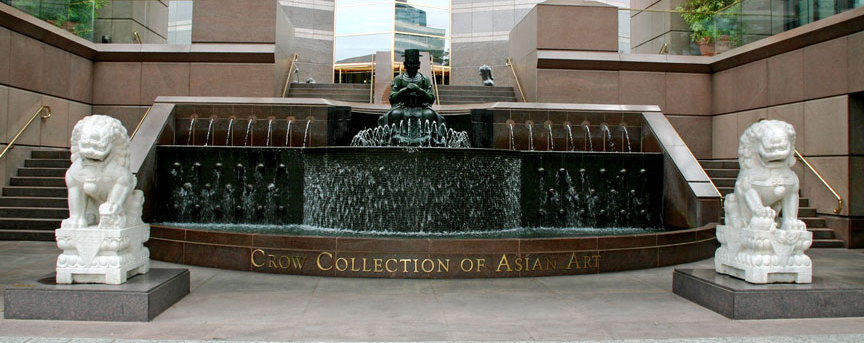
The Seated Daoist Deity fountain at the Crow Collection

The majority of works comprising the Trammell and Margaret Crow collection have been obtained from individual purchases through private dealers and auction houses, as well as through the acquisition of major collections, such as the highly respected Morrie A. Moss collection. The Crow Museum of Asian Art has three galleries.

Gallery I, located on the first floor, is where Japanese art is exhibited, except when travelling exhibitions are on display. The Lotus Shop and garden flank Gallery I. Gallery II occupies the second floor. Chinese artifacts are displayed in Gallery II, as well as in the mezzanine. The museum's jade holdings include a large number of Qing dynasty objects and are a noted strength of the collection. Most of the items are from the 18th century, when the traditional Chinese jade industry (before the arrival of the industrial age) reached its zenith. A number of Qing Dynasty snuff bottles are on display as well.

The Skybridge, a glass structure held up by steel beams connecting Gallery II and Gallery III, offers views of the Nasher Sculpture Center and the Trammell Crow Center, and overlooks The Seated Daoist Deity fountain. Gallery III is the primary site for works of art from Southeast Asia and India. Gallery III is dominated by the Mugal wall, which is hung from the ceiling due to its extreme weight, and two Indian gazebos. One of these "baradari," used in gardens of Indian palaces and residences for relaxation and meditation, spent years at the Crow family farm in East Texas before its selection for the collection.

== Gallery ==
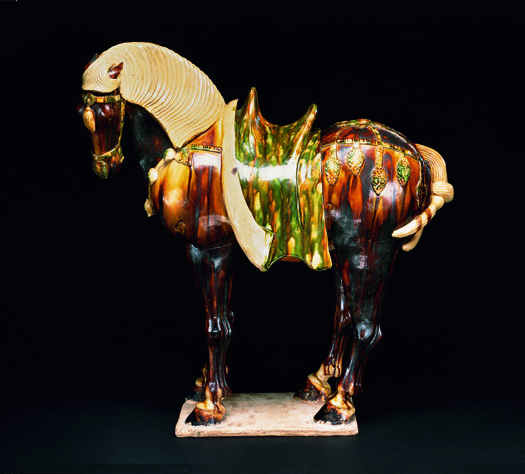
Tang Dynasty Horse, China, 8th century

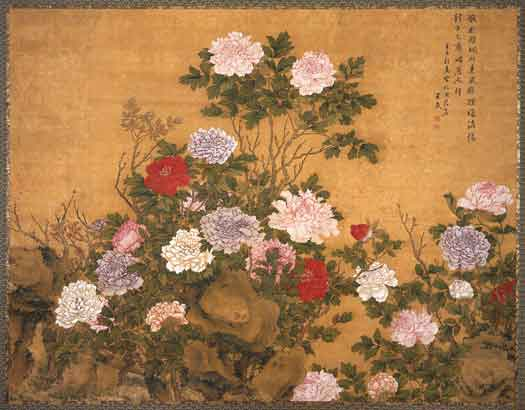
China, Qing dynasty, Kangxi period, 1672 Ink and pigment on silk

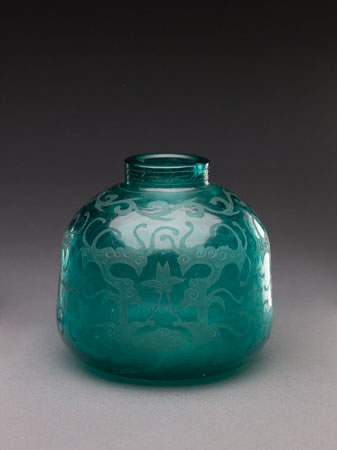
China, Qing dynasty, 18th century Glass

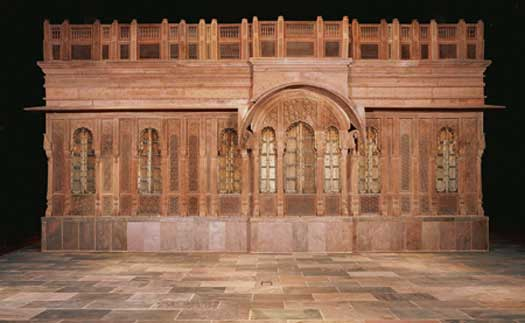
West India, Rajasthan, Mughal period, 18th century Sandstone

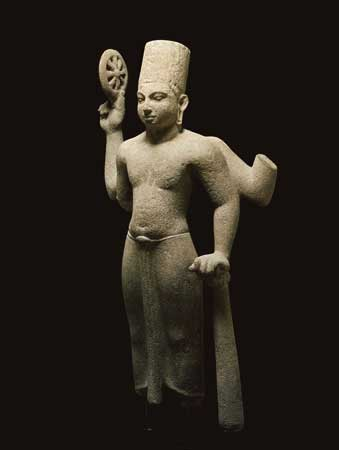
Cambodia, pre-Angkor period, 7th century Sandstone

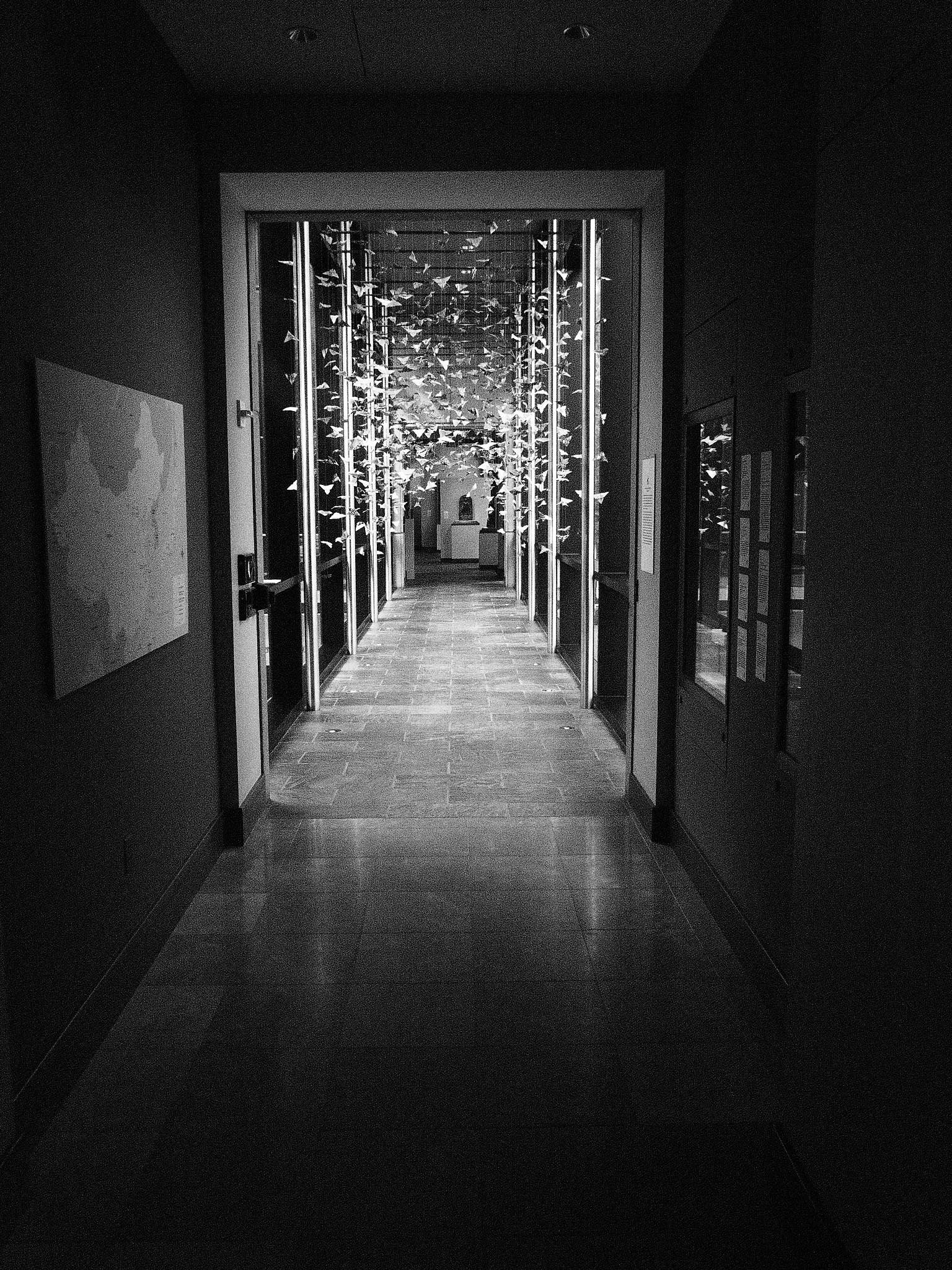
The skybridge connecting Gallery II to Gallery III.

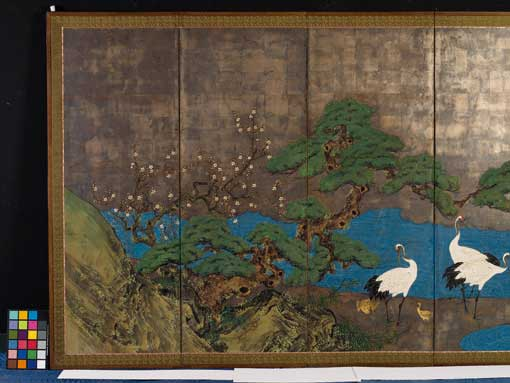
Japan, Edo period, Kano-school style, 1850 Pair of six-fold screens; ink, pigment, silver and gold leaf on paper; wood, silk, and lacquer

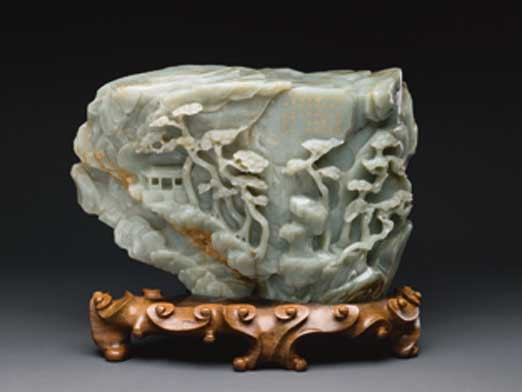
China, Qing dynasty, Qianlong period, 1762 Nephrite and gilding

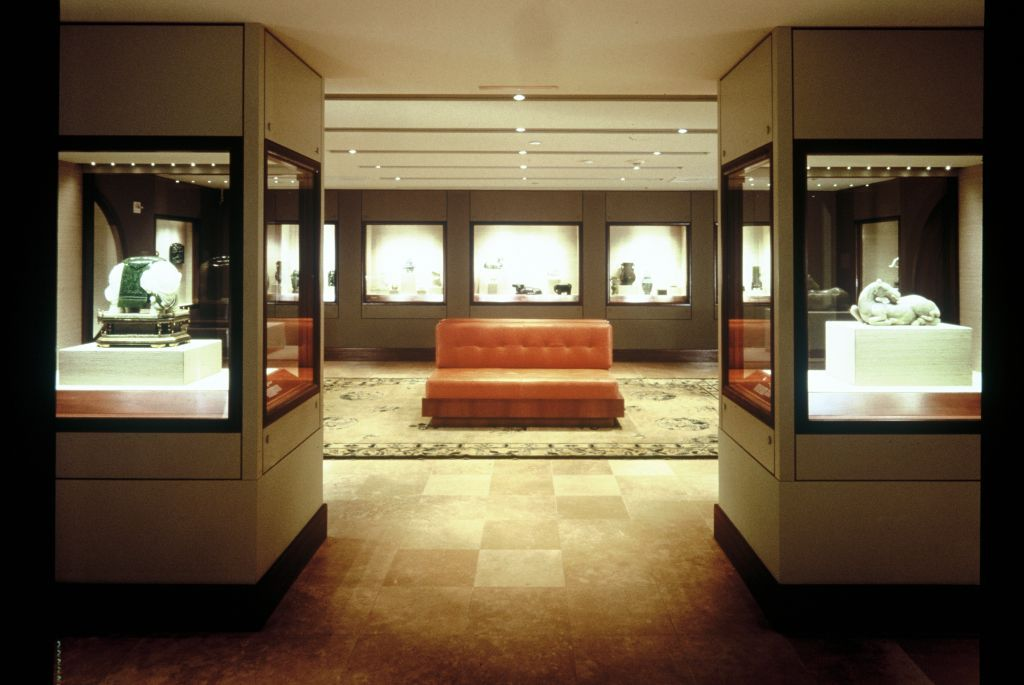
The Jade Room, on the second floor of the Crow museum.

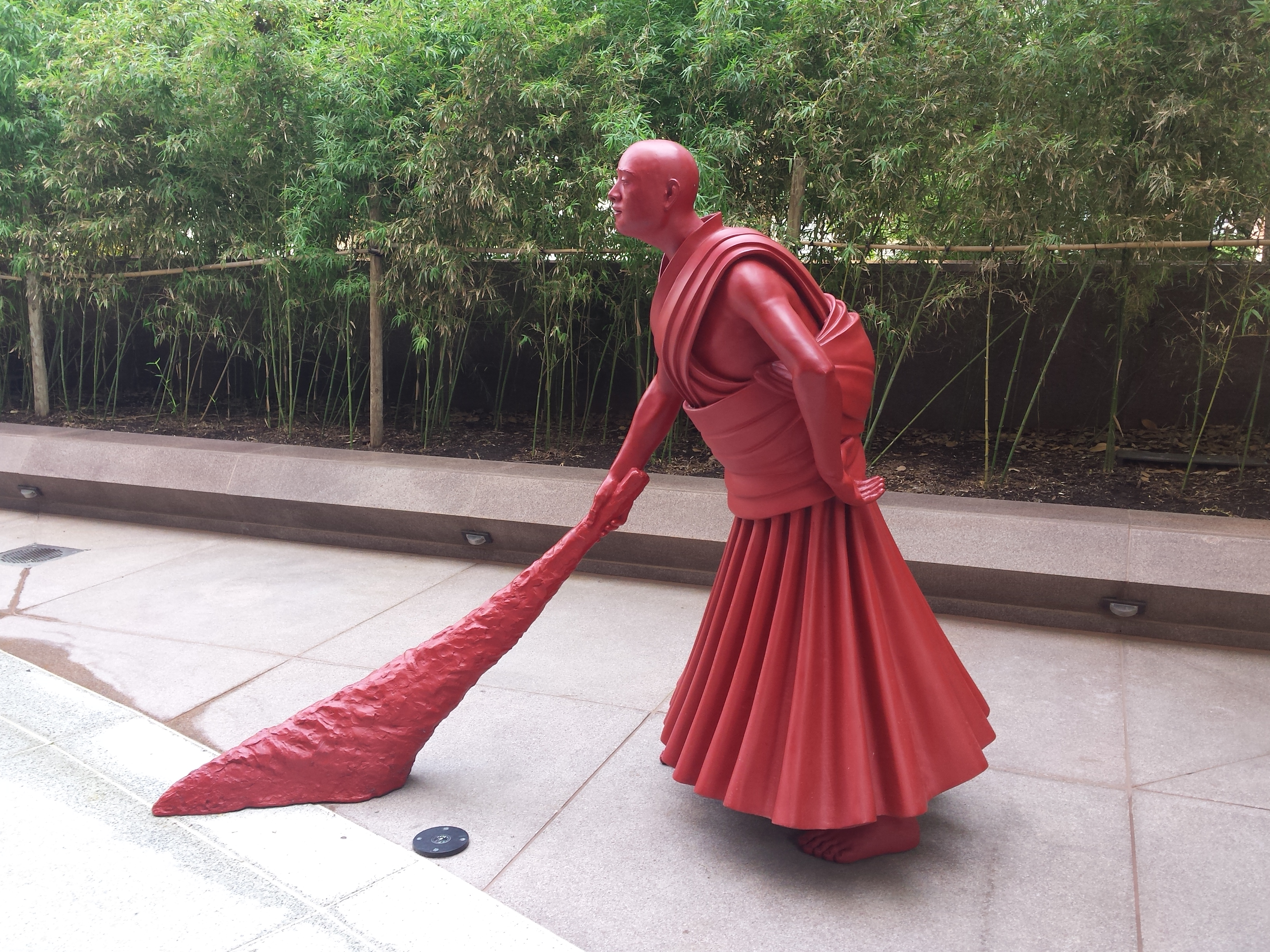
Sweepers sculpture by Wang Shugang in the outdoor sculpture garden.

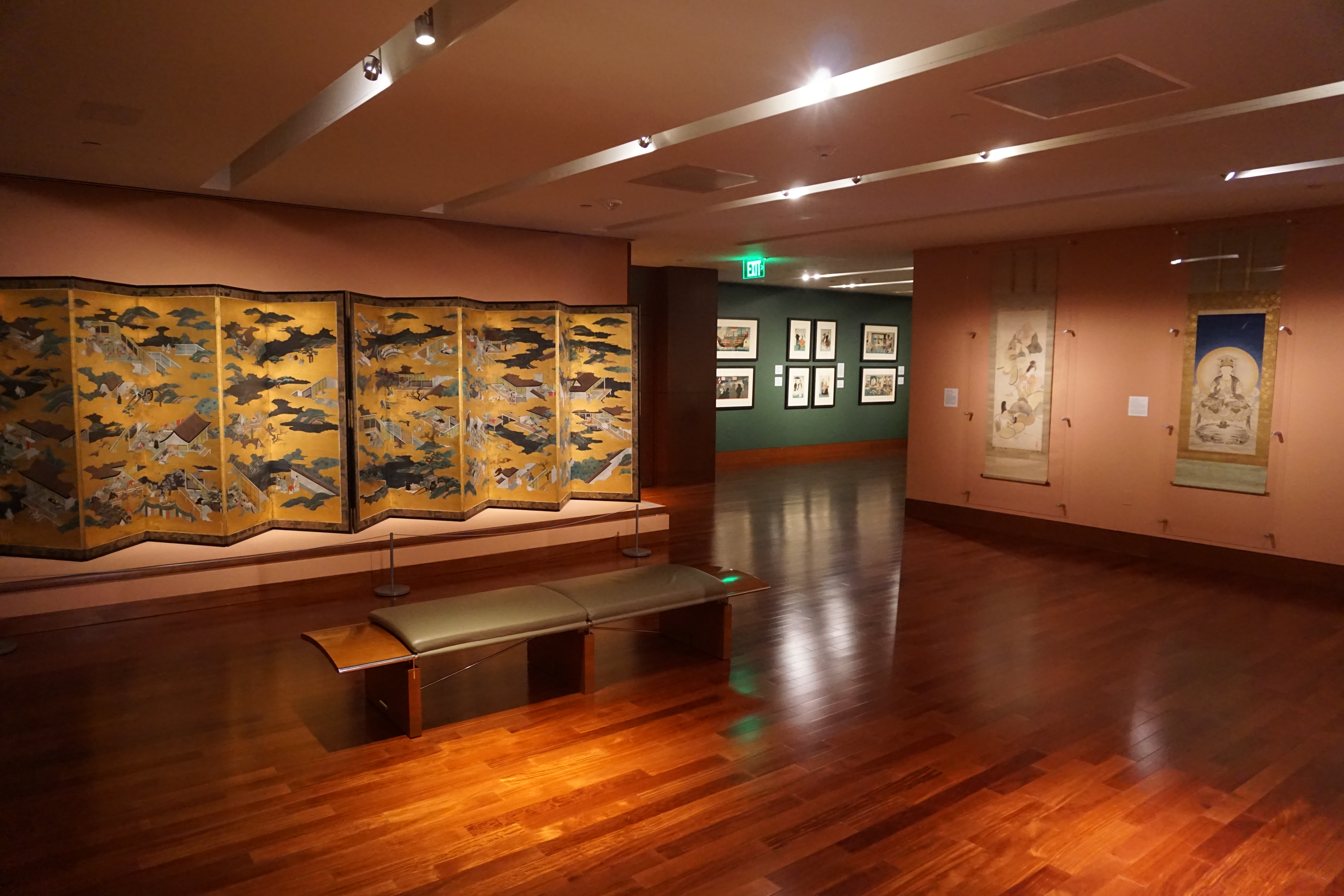
Styled With Poise: Figures in Japanese Paintings and Prints exhibit

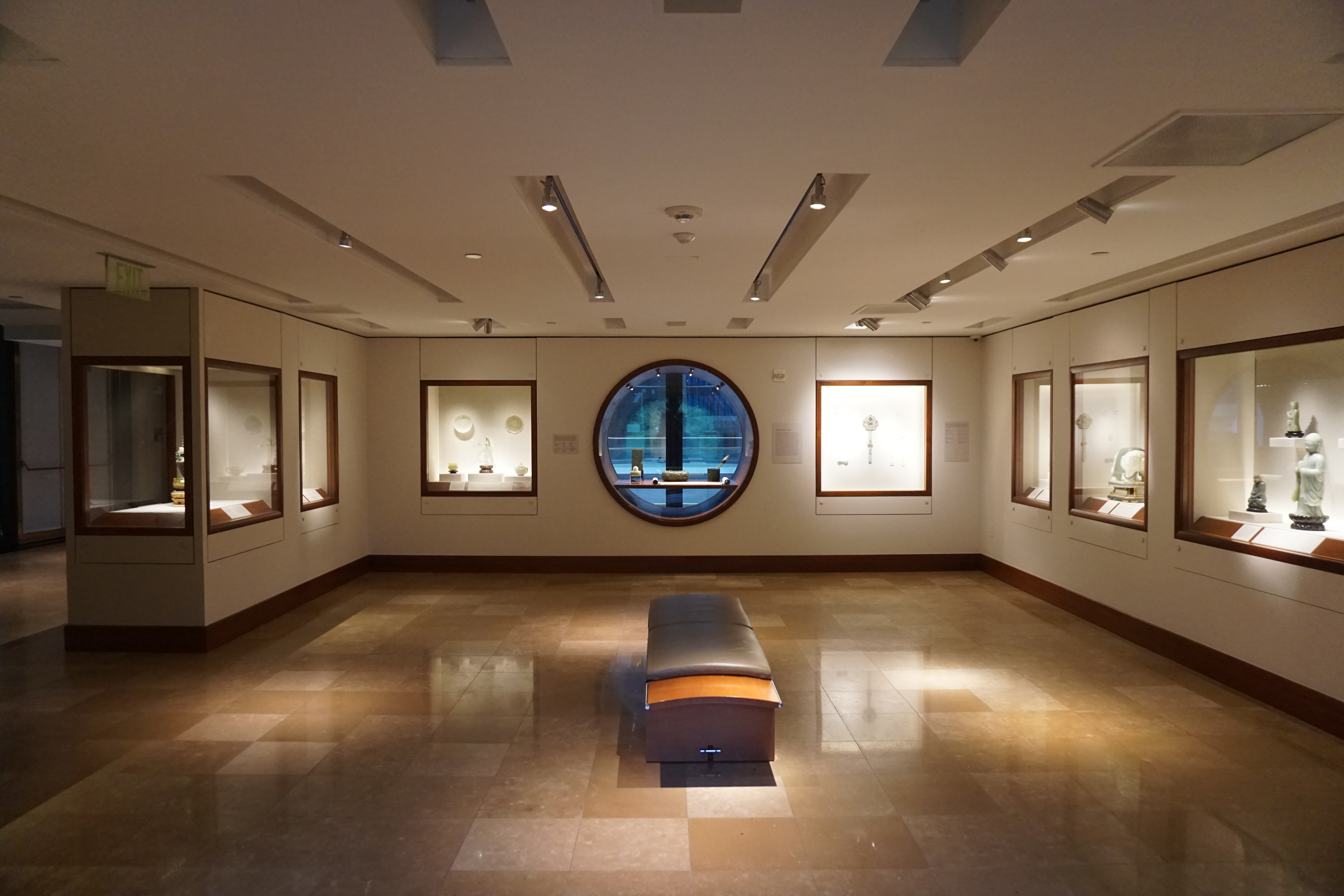
Sculpting Nature: Jade from the Collection exhibit

== Past exhibitions ==
1. Touching the Mekong: A Southeast Asian Sojourn (2006) displayed contemporary black-and-white photography depicting life in Southeast Asia. Over 50 images taken by photographer Andrea Baldeck in 2001 and 2002, documented the cultures and the lives of people living in Vietnam, Myanmar, Cambodia, and Laos.
2. The Spinnaker Collection of Chinese Snuff Bottles (2007) documented the Imperial workshops of Qing Dynasty China (1644–1912) which served Emperors, aristocrats, and literati of the era.
3. Changing Identity: Recent Works by Women Artists from Vietnam (2007) introduced the work of ten contemporary Vietnamese women artists who challenge the stereotypes and traditional roles of women in Vietnamese society, the first survey of its kind to tour the United States. Two generations of artist's views of their country and the changing status of women, reflecting a diverse range of opinions and experiences.
4. Texas Collects Asia (2008) was a series of exhibitions to celebrate The Crow Collection of Asian Art's ten-year anniversary. Five exhibitions covered Japanese art in general and Japanese Folk Art in particular, Indian and Southeast Asian art, Chinese art, and Contemporary art representing the regions.
5. Untamed Beauty: Tigers in Japanese Art (2009) was an exhibition showing the animal's portrayal by twenty-one of Japan's most famous painters of the last three hundred years.
6. Yeohlee: Design For Now (2009) was the first major exhibition in Dallas of Yeohlee and featured selected fashion designs and concepts from her 2004–2009 collections, focussing on the evolution of her approach to design, which closely parallels architectural concerns but is ultimately attentive to the body.
7. Modern Twist: Bamboo Works from the Clark Center and the Art of Motoko Maio (2010) explored the intersection of tradition, innovation, and design by pairing a selection of basket-making works from the Clark Center in Hanford, California, and the screen-making work of Motoko Maio.
8. New Vision: Ballpoint Drawings by Il Lee (2010) explored the language of modernism in Korean-American artist Il Lee's minimalistic representations of line and form, and the contemporary possibilities of drawing and painting in his chosen medium of ball point pen.

== Trammell Crow Center ==
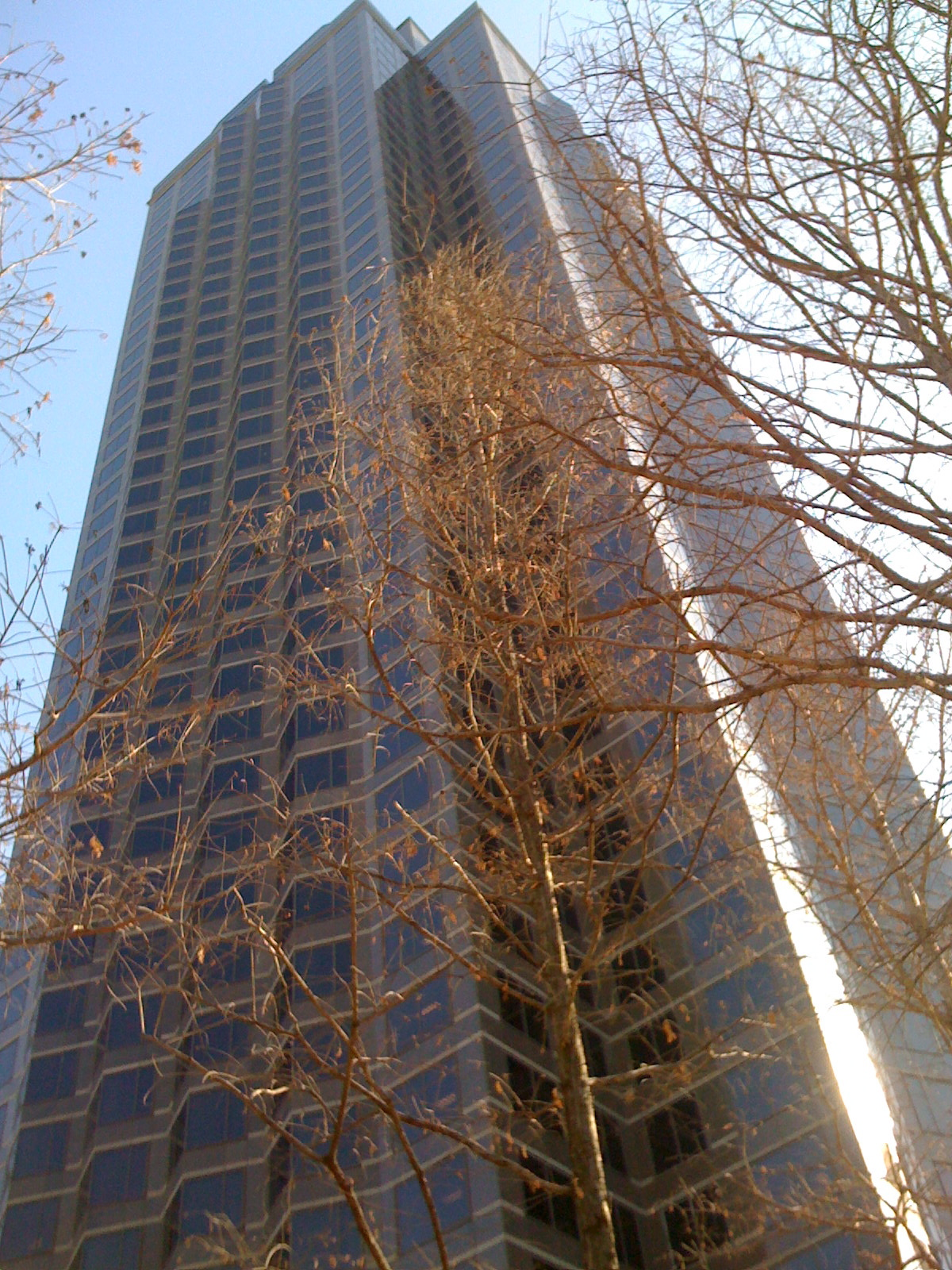
The Trammell Crow Center tower.

Located in the Dallas Central Business District, the Trammell Crow Center stands at a height of 686 feet (209 m) and is the sixth-tallest building in Dallas and the 18th-tallest in Texas. The building totals 1,200,000 square feet (110,000 m^{2}) on 50 floors and has a polished and flamed granite exterior with a garden plaza and is bordered by the Crow Collection. There are many museums near the building: the Nasher Sculpture Center, the Winspear Opera House, and the Dallas Museum of Art.
