= Miles (given name) =

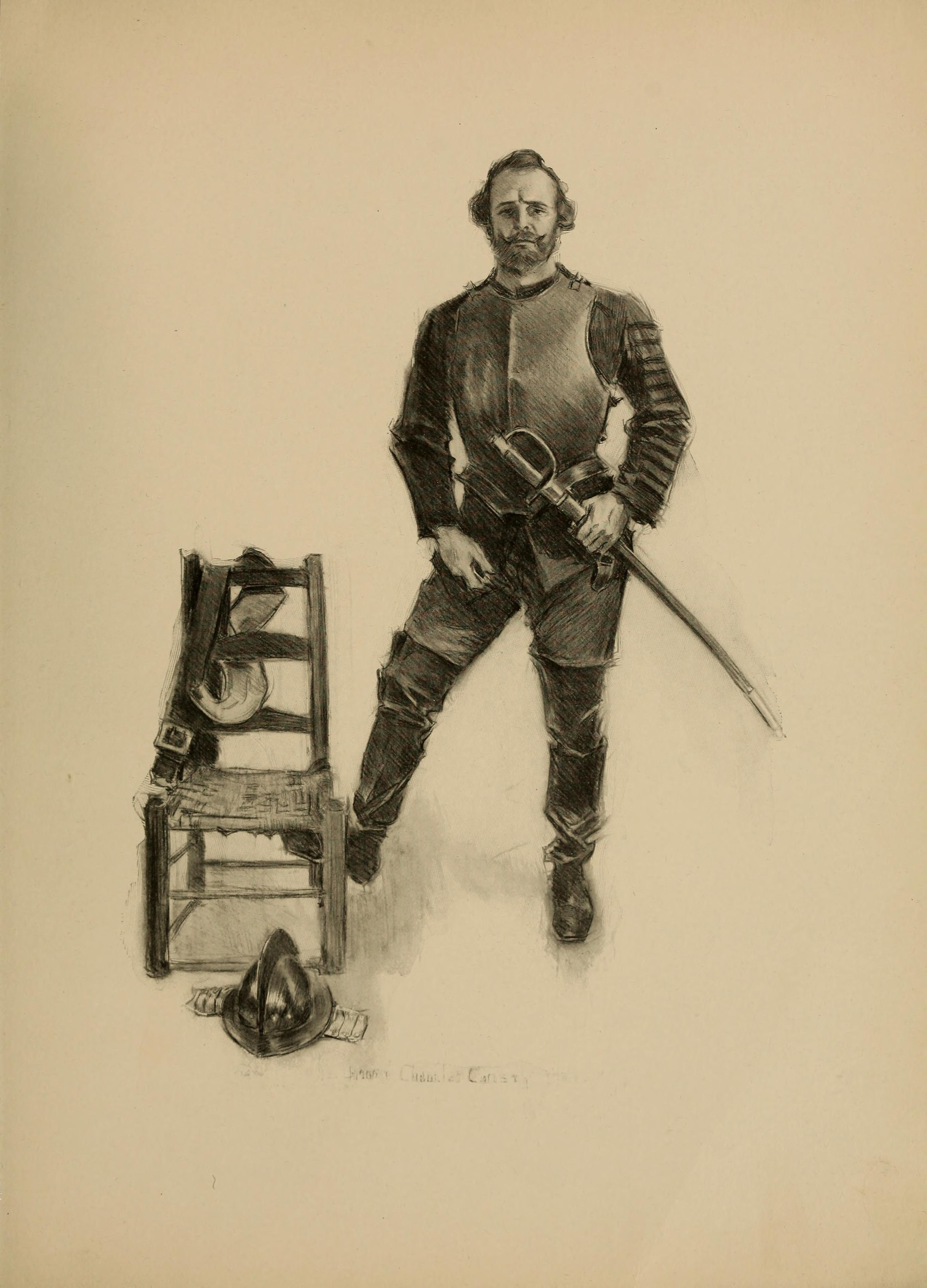
- A fictionalized Myles Standish is a character in Henry Wadsworth Longfellow's 1858 poem The Courtship of Miles Standish.
- Pronunciation: /ˈmaɪlz/
- Gender: Masculine
- Language: English via Norman French

Origin
- Meaning: Latin soldier; Persian brave, Slavic gracious

Other names
- Related names: Milo, Myles

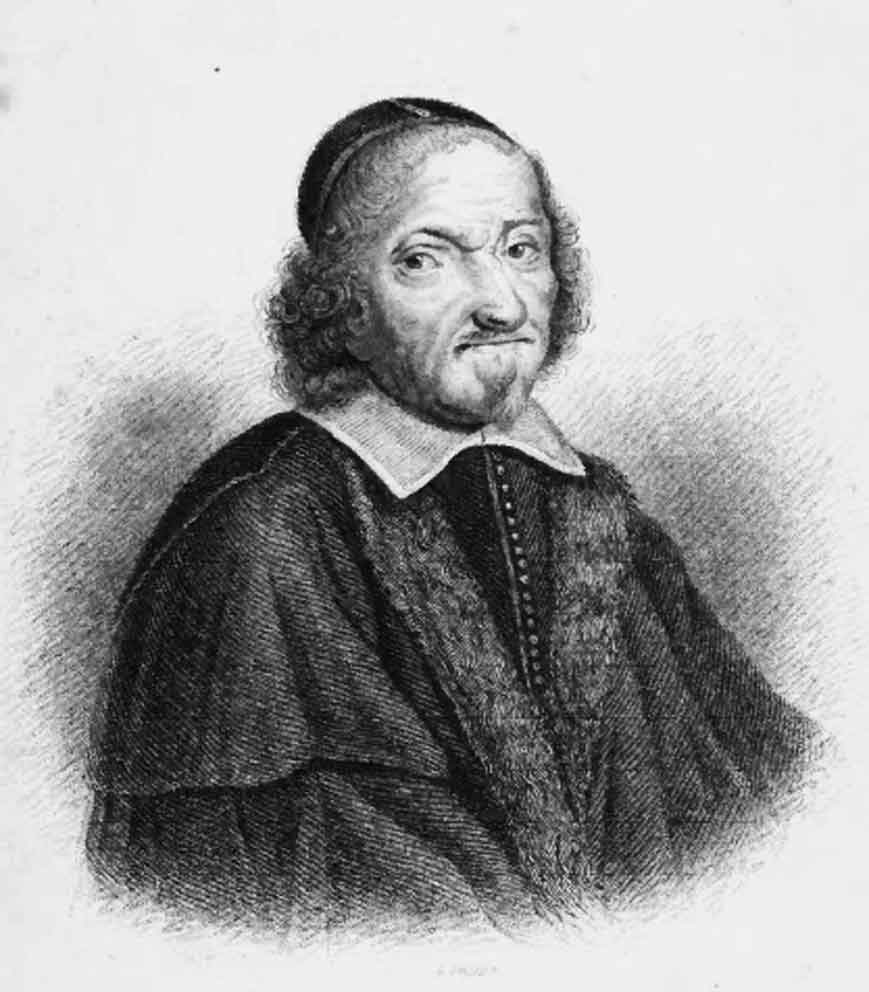
Myles Coverdale produced the first complete printed translation of the Bible into English in 1535.

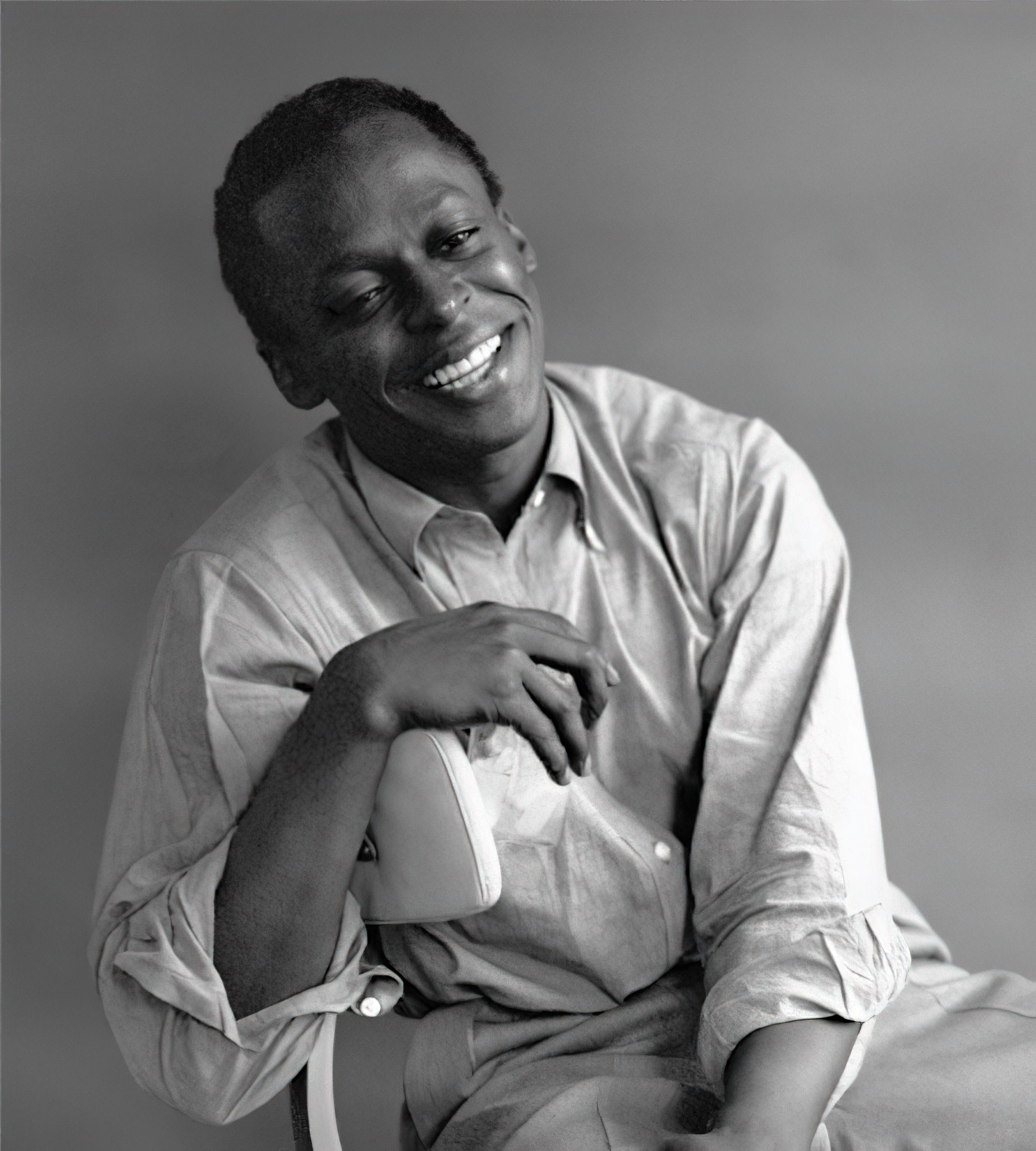
Jazz instrumentalist Miles Davis.

Miles or Myles (/maɪlz/) is a Norman French masculine given name. It might have been a changed diminutive of the name Michael that was influenced by miles, the Latin word for a soldier, because of associations with Archangel Michael, the Roman Catholic patron saint of the military. Myles is a variant spelling in English. Milo, the variant of the name used most often during the medieval era, might also have been influenced by the Slavic ending word element -mil, meaning gracious. In Ireland, the name was used as an English substitute for Irish language names such as Maolra, or Maolmhuire, both meaning devoted to Mary, Maolmhorda, meaning servant of the great, and Maolruanaí, meaning servant of the champion. Development of the name might also have been influenced by the Persian name Mylas, meaning brave. The original name of Miles (bishop of Susa), a Persian Orthodox Christian saint, was Mylas. The name has been in regular use in the Anglosphere since the 1500s. It was popularized in England by Myles Coverdale, who produced the first complete printed translation of the Bible into English in 1535. In the United States, the name became well-known due to Myles Standish, a soldier who arrived on Plymouth Rock on the Mayflower with the Pilgrims in 1620. American poet Henry Wadsworth Longfellow wrote a popular 1858 poem, The Courtship of Miles Standish, in which the fictionalized Standish is rejected by Priscilla Mullins, who chooses John Alden as her husband instead. Miles and Myles were both more commonly used in the United States than in the United Kingdom by the 1800s due to usage by Irish immigrants to the United States and the influence of Miles Standish. There was an increase in usage from the mid- to late 20th century associated with jazz instrumentalist Miles Davis and with the popularity of fictional characters such as Star Trek character Miles O'Brien, Myles Mitchell, a character on the 1990s American television series Moesha, Miles Edgeworth, a character from the Ace Attorney video game franchise, Miles Prower from the Sonic the Hedgehog video game franchise and fictional Marvel Comics superhero Miles Morales.

== People with the name ==
- Miles (bishop of Susa) (d. c. 340)
- Miles of Gloucester, 1st Earl of Hereford (d. 1143)
- Miles of Plancy (d. 1174), Crusader knight
- Miles de Cogan (fl. 1170s), Anglo-Norman knight
- Miles de Angulo (fl. 1250s), Anglo-Irish knight
- Miles of Marseilles (b. c. 1294), Jewish physician
- Miles de Noyers (d. 1350), French diplomat
- Miles Aiken (born 1941), American basketball player
- Miles Austin (born 1984), American football player
- Miles Barne (disambiguation), multiple people
- Miles Battle (born 2000), American football player
- Miles Joseph Berkeley (1803−1889), British botanist and clergyman
- Miles Boykin (born 1996), American football player
- Miles Briggs (born 1983), British politician
- Miles Brown (disambiguation), multiple people
- Miles Browning (1897−1954), United States Navy admiral
- Miles Caton (born 2005), American actor and musician
- Miles Copeland (disambiguation), multiple people
- Miles Dale (disambiguation), multiple people
- Miles Dempsey (1896−1969), British Army general
- Miles Davis (1926−1991), American jazz trumpeter
- Miles Fleetwood (d. 1641), English politician
- Miles Franklin (1879−1954), Australian author
- Miles Graham (1895−1976), British Army general
- Miles Groth (born 1946), American philosopher
- Miles Heizer (born 1994), American actor
- Miles Holmwood, Canadian guitarist and record producer
- Miles Horton (disambiguation), multiple people
- Miles James, United States soldier
- Miles Jones (disambiguation), multiple people
- Miles Jupp (born 1979), English actor and comedian
- Miles Kane (born 1986), English musician
- Miles Kitselman (born 2002), American football player
- Miles Lord (1919−2016), American jurist
- Miles Malleson (1888−1969), English actor and screenwriter
- Miles Mander (1888−1946), English actor
- Miles Mastrobuoni (born 1995), American baseball player
- Miles Mikolas (born 1988), American baseball player
- Miles E. Mills (1891–1972), American politician
- Miles Nazaire (born 1995), English television personality
- Miles Nesmith (born 2008), American athlete
- Miles O'Brien (disambiguation), multiple people
- Miles Ocampo (born 1997), Filipina actress
- Miles M. Oviatt (1840–1880), American Civl War Medal of Honor recipient
- Miles Nightingall (1768–1829), British army officer
- Miles Partridge (d. 1552), English courtier
- Miles Plumlee (born 1988), American basketball player
- Miles Robinson (disambiguation), multiple people
- Miles Rock (1840–1901), American civil engineer, geologist and astronomer
- Miles Romans-Hopcraft, English musician under the name Wu-Lu
- Miles Routledge (born 1999), English author and war tourist
- Miles Sanders (born 1997), American football player
- Miles Sandys (disambiguation), multiple people
- Miles Scott (disambiguation), multiple people
- Miles Smith (disambiguation), multiple people
- Miles Stapleton (disambiguation), multiple people
- Miles Taylor (disambiguation), multiple people
- Miles Teller (born 1987), American actor
- Miles Thomas (1897−1980), British businessman
- Miles Walker (born 1940), Manx politician
- Miles Warren (1929−2022), New Zealand architect

== Fictional characters ==
- "Baby", protagonist in the film Baby Driver whose real name is Miles
- Miles, a mule character in the animated movie Barnyard
- Miles, a character in the animated series The Ridonculous Race
- Miles, a character in the animated series Rimba Racer
- Miles, a character in the animated series Angry Kid
- Miles Archer, character in the novel The Maltese Falcon and its adaptations
- Miles Axlerod, character and main antagonist of Cars 2
- Miles Bailey, character in the British soap opera Doctors
- Miles Callisto, character in the animated television series Miles from Tomorrowland
- Miles Dyson, character in the film Terminator 2: Judgment Day
- Miles Edgeworth, character in the Ace Attorney video game series
- Miles Finch, character in the film Elf
- Miles Hendon, character in the novel The Prince and the Pauper by Mark Twain and its adaptations
- Miles Hollingsworth, character in the television series Degrassi: The Next Generation
- M (James Bond), character in the James Bond novels whose real name is Sir Miles Messervy
- Miles Lennox, character in the television series Backstage
- Miles Morales / Spider-Man, character from Marvel Comics
- Miles Mayhem, antagonist of the animated television series M.A.S.K.
- Miles Matheson, protagonist of the television series Revolution
- Miles O'Brien (Star Trek), character in the Star Trek universe
- Miles Papazian, character in the television series 24
- Miles "Tails" Prower, fox character in the Sonic the Hedgehog series
- Miles Quaritch, the central antagonist of Avatar and its sequels
- Miles Shortman, a character from Nickelodeon's Hey Arnold!
- Miles Silverberg, character in the television series Murphy Brown
- Miles Straume, character in the television series Lost
- Miles Teg, character in the Dune universe
- Miles Upshur, character in the video game Outlast
- Miles Vorkosigan, character in the Vorkosigan Saga novels and stories
- Miles Warren a.k.a. the Jackal, antagonist in Spider-Man comics
- Miles Webber, character in the television series The Golden Girls
- Major Miles, a character in the manga series Fullmetal Alchemist
- Miles, a character in Henry James' novella The Turn of the Screw
- Miles Tuck, a character in the book Tuck Everlasting by Natalie Babbitt
- Miles Fairchild, a character in the movie The Turning

== See also ==
- Miles (disambiguation)
- Miles (surname)
- Myles (given name)
