= Milo =

Milo may refer to:

== Arts and entertainment ==
- Milo (magazine), a strength sports magazine
- Milo: Sticky Notes and Brain Freeze, a 2011 children's novel by Alan Silberberg
- Milo (video game)
- Milo (TV series), British animated children's series

== Computing and technology ==
- MILO (boot loader), a firmware replacement used for booting Linux on older Alpha AXP hardware
- Milo, a computer algebra system by Paracomp
- Eclipse Milo, an open source implementation of the communication protocol OPC Unified Architecture
- Project Milo, a tech demo for Microsoft's Kinect

== Food and drink ==
- Milo (chocolate bar), an Australian chocolate bar made with Milo powder
- Milo (drink), a brand name of a chocolate malt drink by Nestlé

== Plants ==
- Milo, a common name of Thespesia populnea and its wood
- Milo, a common name for some varieties of commercial sorghum

== People ==
- Milo (name), a list of people and fictional characters with the given name or surname
- Titus Annius Milo (died 48 BC), Ancient Roman politician
- Milo (footballer) (born 1990), Egyptian footballer Islam Mohamed Ramadan Rashd
- Milo (musician) (born 1992), former stage name of American hip hop musician now known as R.A.P. Ferreira

== Places ==
=== Italy ===
- Milo, Catania, a comune
- Milo, Trapani, a frazione

=== United States ===
- Milo, Indiana, an unincorporated community
- Milo, Iowa, a city
- Milo, Maine, a town
  - Milo (CDP), Maine, the main village in the town
- Milo, Missouri, a village
- Milo, New York, a town
- Milo, Oklahoma, an unincorporated community
- Milo, Oregon, an unincorporated community
- Milo, West Virginia, an unincorporated community

=== Elsewhere ===
- Milo, Alberta, Canada, a village
- Milo, Ethiopia, a town
- Milo, Kenya, a sub-location
- Milo, Tanzania, a village and ward
- Milo, Carmarthenshire, Wales, a village
- Milo River, a tributary of the Niger River, Guinea

== See also ==
- Milos (disambiguation)
- Mylo (disambiguation)
- Yourcodenameis:milo, a UK post-hardcore band
- Millo, a structure in Jerusalem
