= Milo (name) =

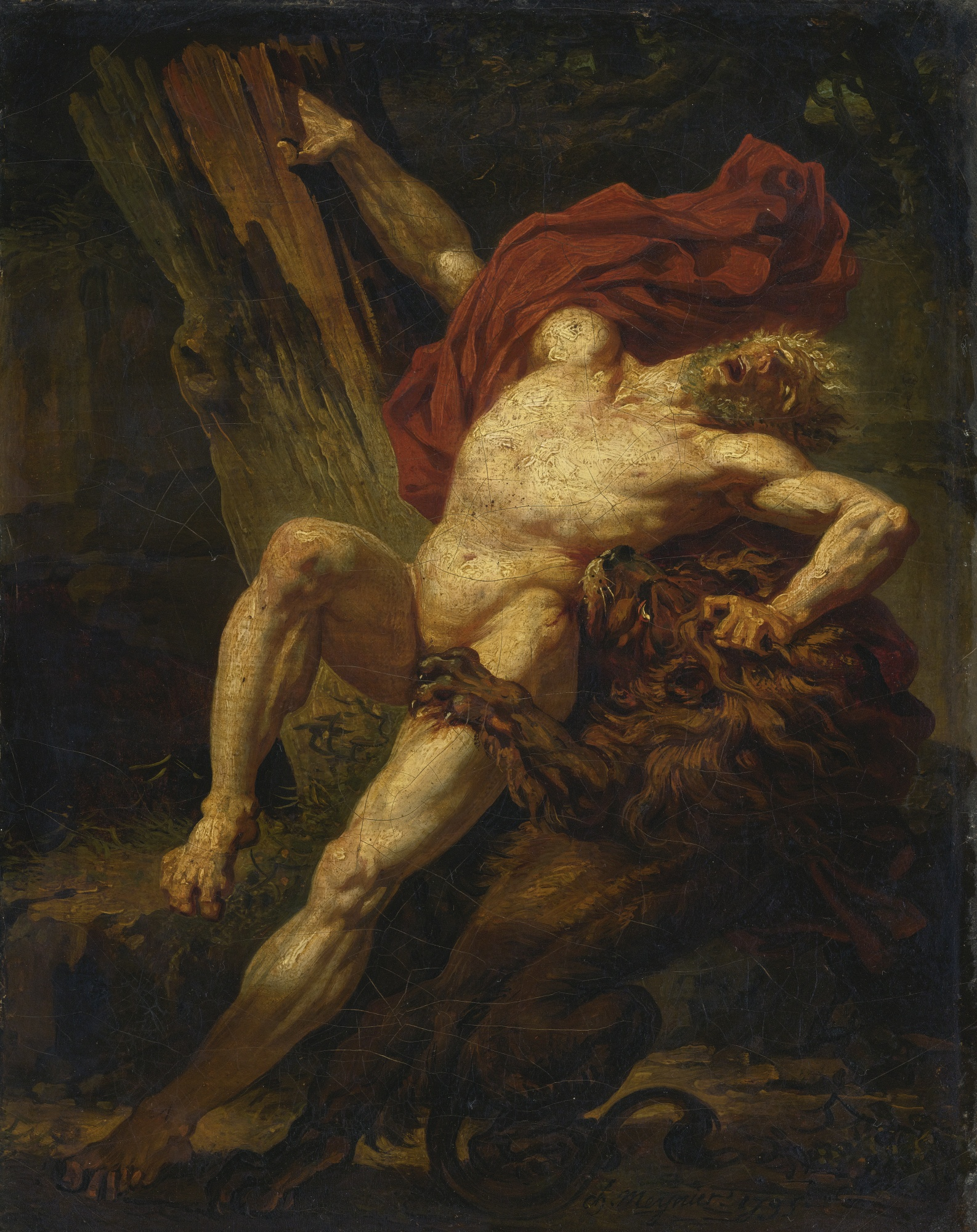
- Milo of Croton Attacked by a Lion by Charles Meynier, 1795.
- Pronunciation: (/ˈmaɪloʊ/ or (/ˈmiːloʊ/ or MY-loh or MEE-loh
- Gender: Masculine
- Language: Greek, Latin, Slavic, Germanic

Origin
- Meaning: Greek: Yew tree; Irish Anglicization of Máelmuire; Latin form of Miles; Slavic: kind, loving, gracious

Milo is a masculine given name and a surname with multiple origins.

The name was used in medieval England as the Latin version of Miles or Mile meaning soldier. It is also an ancient Greek name derived from milos, meaning "yew tree". Milo was also used in Ireland as an English translation of the Irish Máelmuire, meaning "devotee of Mary". The name can also be related to the Slavic element mil, meaning "kind", "loving", "gracious".

The names Milos, Mylo, Milós, Miles, Miilo and Miloš are all related masculine names.

== Usage ==
The name Milo was in greater use in the northern United States during the 19th century than it was in the United Kingdom. The increase in popularity has been attributed to a revival of the Classics in the Northern United States. The death of Milo of Croton was a favorite literary subject. The popularity of the name for American boys was also partly due to Irish immigration to the United States.

The name ranked among the top 1,000 names for American boys between 1880 and 1966 but then declined in use. It increased in use in the Anglosphere after 2000, due to cultural influences such as a character in the 2001 animated Disney film Atlantis: The Lost Empire and the fame of American actor Milo Ventimiglia. The name also is similar in sound to other names that have come into fashion such as Miles and Leo.

Milo is a well-used name for boys in the 2020s in Belgium, Canada, Finland, France, Germany, Italy, Netherlands, Sweden, Switzerland, the United Kingdom, the United States, and Uruguay.

== People ==
=== Given name ===
- Milo of Croton, 6th-century BC ancient Greek wrestler
- Milo (bishop of Trier) (died 762 or 763), Archbishop of Reims and of Trier
- Milo I of Montlhéry (died 1102), Lord of Montlhéry
- Milo M. Acker (1853–1922), New York politician
- Milo Aukerman (born 1963), American biochemist and lead singer of the punk rock band the Descendents
- Milo Samuel Baker (1868–1961), American botanist
- Milo Butler (1906–1979), first Bahamian governor-general
- Milo Cawthorne (born 1989), New Zealand actor
- Milo Cipra (1906–1985), Croatian composer
- Milo Colton (born 1943), American politician
- Milo de Angelis (born 1951), Italian language poet
- Milo Dor (1923–2005), Serbian-Austrian author
- Milo Duçi (1870–1933), Albanian publisher, playwright, and entrepreneur
- Milo Đukanović (born 1962), former Prime Minister and current President of Montenegro
- Milo Eifler (born 1998), American football player
- Milo Gibson (born 1990), American actor
- Milo Emil Halbheer (1910–1978), German painter
- Milo Hamilton (1927–2015), American sportscaster
- Milo Hrnić (1950–2023), Croatian pop singer
- Milo Kendall (1819–1905), American lawyer
- Milo Manara (born 1945), Italian artist
- Milo Manheim (born 2001), American actor
- Milo Milunović (1897–1967), Yugoslav and Montenegrin painter
- Milo Moiré (born 1983), Swiss artist
- Milo A. Root (1863–1917), justice of the Washington Supreme Court
- Milo O'Shea (1926–2013), Irish actor
- Milo Parker (born 2002), English actor
- Milo Petrović-Njegoš (1889–1978), prince of Montenegro
- Milo Quesada (1930–2012), Argentine actor
- Milo Radulovich (1926–2007), American US Air Force reserve accused of having Communist sympathies
- Milo Rau (born 1977), Swiss theater director
- Milo Silvestro, Italian musician and lead vocalist of American heavy metal band Fear Factory
- Milo Ventimiglia (born 1977), American film actor
- Milo Yiannopoulos (born 1983), British media personality

=== Surname ===
- Candi Milo (born 1961), American actress
- Federico Milo (born 1992), Argentine footballer
- Leon Milo (1956–2014), American composer, percussionist and sound artist
- Luciano Milo (born 1980), Italian figure skater
- Ray Milo (born 1954), American football player
- Roni Milo (born 1949), Israeli politician and 10th mayor of Tel Aviv
- Sandra Milo (1933–2024), Italian actress

== Places ==
- Milos, island that is a part of the Aegean Islands of Greece

== Fictional characters ==
- Milo Bloom, in Berkeley Breathed's comic strip Bloom County
- Milo Kerrigan, in the Australian television series Full Frontal
- Milo Minderbinder, in Joseph Heller's novels Catch-22 and Closing Time
- Frank Milo, played by Bill Murray in the 1993 American crime comedy-drama movie Mad Dog and Glory
- Milo Fishtooth, the main character in the animated television series Fish Hooks
- Milo Janus, the murderer in the Columbo Season 4 Episode An Exercise in Fatality
- Milo Murphy, from Milo Murphy's Law, an American animated television series
- Milo Powell, the protagonist of the Canadian-Filipino animated series Captain Flamingo
- Milo Pressman, in the American television series 24
- Milo Rambaldi, in the American television series Alias
- Milo Standish, in Brothers, a 1986 novel by William Goldman
- Milo James Thatch, the protagonist of the Disney film Atlantis: The Lost Empire
- Milo Tindle, the lover of Andrew Wyke's wife in Sleuth, the 1970 play by Anthony Shaffer; played by Michel Caine in the 1972 film
- Milo, former byname of American rapper Rory Allen Phillip Ferreira
- Milo, the amnesiac driver of the "real Christine" in the 2015 horror adventure novel series Demon Road
- Milo, the protagonist of the 1961 children's adventure novel The Phantom Tollbooth
- Milo, the purple-skinned character in the children's television show Tweenies
- Professor Milo, an enemy of Batman in the DC Comics universe
- Milo, a dog belonging to the main character in The Mask
- Milo, a cat and one of the protagonists of the film The Adventures of Milo and Otis
- Milo, the mascot of the 2026 Winter Paralympics
- Milo, character from Doraemon: Nobita's Art World Tales
- Milo, a character from the animated band Prozzäk
- Milo Russo, a character from Wizards Beyond Waverly Place

== See also ==
- Milo (disambiguation)
- Milović
- Mito (name)
- Mylo (disambiguation)
