= Inter-Secondary Schools Boys and Girls Championships =

Jamaican high school track and field meet

The ISSA Grace Kennedy Boys and Girls Championships (better known as Champs) is an annual Jamaican high school track and field meet held by Jamaica's Inter-Secondary Schools Sports Association ISSA. The five day event, held during the last week before Easter in Kingston, has been considered a proving ground for many Jamaican athletes.

== History ==
The Championships began as a standardized sports day for six of Jamaica's oldest high schools, Potsdam (now Munro College), St. George's College, Jamaica College, the Wolmer's School, New College and Mandeville Middle Grade School. Originally known as the Inter-Secondary School Championship Sports, rules and staging of the event were managed by an Organizing Committee comprising the headmasters of the six boys' schools and was first chaired by William Cowper, headmaster of Wolmer's. A cadre of volunteers consisting of coaches, sports masters and others served as timekeepers, starters, referees and other meet officials.

The first Boys' Champs began at the test cricket ground Sabina Park on June 29, 1910, in Kingston, Jamaica.

Loosely modelled after the school athletic sports at British public schools such as Eton and Harrow, the event quickly gained popularity among the Jamaican public. Over six previous years, fans had attended a boys' track meet in which athletes were given handicaps according to age, reputation and overall appearance – as in a horse race – but this format was discontinued in 1910 when new rules and a new trophy were introduced.

There is evidence of a Girls' Athletics Championships as early as 1914 in Kingston, but after re-emerging under different organizations in the 1940s, 1957, then 1961, the girls' event had an unbroken run since being managed by the Games Mistresses Association (founded 1963), a national organization of physical education teachers.

Only sixteen schools have ever won a boys' or girls' championship, with Kingston College (1962–1975) having the longest boys' winning streak and Vere Technical winning the girls division the most times in a row (1979–1993). In its history, only Excelsior High School and St. Jago High have ever won both boys' and girls' divisions at Champs. The feat has never been accomplished in the same year.

St Hilda's Diocesan High School in St Ann was the first school to win the girls championship.

== ISSA and GMA ==
In 1999, after years of deliberation between the ISSA and GMA, and precipitated by shrinking revenues particularly at Girls' Champs, the GMA ceded control of the girls' event to ISSA. The two meets are now staged together over five days, beginning with field events and ending with all relays.

The Games Mistresses Association (GMA) of Jamaica has been led by Presidents including Joyce Taylor, Barbara Jones and Joan Lloyd-Hudson. Lloyd-Hudson took over the Presidency from Barbara Jones and served for two years. She improved the operations of the championship and negotiated a sponsorship deal with MILO. The Presidents are selected by a national election, Jamaican physical education high school teachers gather in Kingston annually for the elections. Among the responsibilities of the GMA are management of girls' sports on a national level, including the physical education curriculum.

The GMA merged with ISSA in 1999 after several years of discussion with the principals of the nation's high schools. Some supporters of the continuation of a GMA-led girl's champs thought the move was purely a financial one. Others believed the ISSA group wanted to have full control of both boys and girls champs which would allow more effective planning of the championships.

The girls and boys championships are the biggest track and field event involving high school students anywhere in the world. These events are planned around high school students and often attract college coaches from around the world. Many of these students receive college scholarships (outside of the country) on the track during the meet.

After the 5-day championship, the students in their home schools, prepare to go to the Penn Relays in the USA where they often dominate all the sprint events. Those schools who may have lost a particular event at the Girls or boys championship look forward to a second opportunity at the Penn relays.

== Boys' Champions ==
A list of the winners of the Boys' Champs.

- 1910: Wolmer's Boys
- 1911: Jamaica College
- 1912: Jamaica College
- 1913: Jamaica College
- 1914: St. George's College
- 1915: Wolmer's Boys
- 1916: Jamaica College
- 1917: Wolmer's Boys
- 1918: Jamaica College
- 1919: Jamaica College
- 1920: Munro College
- 1921: Jamaica College
- 1922: Jamaica College
- 1923: Jamaica College
- 1924: Wolmer's Boys
- 1925: St. George's College
- 1926: Munro College
- 1927: Wolmer's Boys
- 1928: Jamaica College
- 1929: Wolmer's Boys
- 1930: Calabar High School
- 1931: Calabar High
- 1932: Calabar High
- 1933: Calabar High
- 1934: Munro College
- 1935: Munro College
- 1936: Calabar High
- 1937: Kingston College
- 1938: Wolmer's Boys
- 1939: Wolmer's Boys
- 1940: Jamaica College
- 1941: Wolmer's Boys
- 1942: Kingston College
- 1943: Munro College
- 1944: No Competition
- 1945: Munro College
- 1946: Calabar High
- 1947: Munro College
- 1948: Munro College
- 1949: Wolmer's Boys
- 1950: Kingston College
- 1951: Kingston College
- 1952: Jamaica College
- 1953: Kingston College
- 1954: Kingston College
- 1955: Calabar High
- 1956: Wolmer's Boys
- 1957: Kingston College
- 1958: Calabar High
- 1959: Jamaica College
- 1960: Excelsior High
- 1961: Calabar High
- 1962: Kingston College
- 1963: Kingston College
- 1964: Kingston College
- 1965: Kingston College
- 1966: Kingston College
- 1967: Kingston College
- 1968: Kingston College
- 1969: Kingston College
- 1970: Kingston College
- 1971: Kingston College
- 1972: Kingston College
- 1973: Kingston College
- 1974: Kingston College
- 1975: Kingston College
- 1976: Calabar High
- 1977: Calabar High
- 1978: Calabar High
- 1979: Kingston College
- 1980: Kingston College
- 1981: Calabar High
- 1982: Clarendon College
- 1983: Kingston College
- 1984: Clarendon College
- 1985: Clarendon College
- 1986: Calabar High
- 1987: St. Jago High
- 1988: Calabar High
- 1989: Calabar High
- 1990: Calabar High
- 1991: Jamaica College
- 1992: Jamaica College
- 1993: St. Jago High
- 1994: Jamaica College
- 1995: Jamaica College
- 1996: Calabar High
- 1997: Calabar High
- 1998: Jamaica College
- 1999: Jamaica College
- 2000: Jamaica College
- 2001: Kingston College
- 2002: Kingston College
- 2003: Kingston College
- 2004: Kingston College
- 2005: Kingston College
- 2006: Kingston College
- 2007: Calabar High
- 2008: Calabar High
- 2009: Kingston College
- 2010: Wolmer's Boys
- 2011: Jamaica College
- 2012: Calabar High
- 2013: Calabar High
- 2014: Calabar High
- 2015: Calabar High
- 2016: Calabar High
- 2017: Calabar High
- 2018: Calabar High
- 2019: Kingston College
- 2020: Cancelled due to the global COVID-19 pandemic
- 2021: Jamaica College
- 2022: Kingston College
- 2023: Kingston College
- 2024: Kingston College
- 2025: Kingston College
- 2026: Jamaica College

== Girls' Champions ==
A list of the winners of Girls' Champs.

- 1957: St. Hilda's High
- 1958-60: No Competition
- 1961: Manchester High School, Jamaica
- 1962: St. Andrew High School
- 1963: Titchfield High School
- 1964: Titchfield High
- 1965: Manning's School
- 1966: Manning's School
- 1967: Vere Technical
- 1968: Vere Technical
- 1969: Manning's School
- 1970: Excelsior
- 1971: Excelsior
- 1972: Excelsior
- 1973: Excelsior High
- 1974: Vere Technical
- 1975: Vere Technical
- 1976: St Mary High School, Jamaica
- 1977: St Mary High
- 1978: Queen's School, Jamaica
- 1979: Vere Technical
- 1980: Vere Technical
- 1981: Vere Technical
- 1982: Vere Technical
- 1983: Vere Technical
- 1984: Vere Technical
- 1985: Vere Technical
- 1986: Vere Technical
- 1987: Vere Technical
- 1988: Vere Technical
- 1990: Vere Technical
- 1991: Vere Technical
- 1992: Vere Technical
- 1993: Vere Technical
- 1994: Manchester High
- 1995: Manchester High
- 1996: St Jago High
- 1997: St Jago High
- 1998: St Jago High
- 1999: St Jago High
- 2000: Vere Technical
- 2001: Vere Technical
- 2002: Vere Technical
- 2003: Holmwood Technical
- 2004: Holmwood Technical
- 2005: Holmwood Technical
- 2006: Holmwood Technical
- 2007: Holmwood Technical
- 2008: Holmwood Technical
- 2009: Holmwood Technical
- 2010: Holmwood Technical
- 2011: Holmwood Technical
- 2012: Edwin Allen High
- 2013: Holmwood Technical
- 2014: Edwin Allen High
- 2015: Edwin Allen High
- 2016: Edwin Allen High
- 2017: Edwin Allen High
- 2018: Edwin Allen High
- 2019: Edwin Allen High
- 2020: Cancelled due to the global coronavirus pandemic
- 2021: Edwin Allen High
- 2022: Edwin Allen High
- 2023: Hydel High School
- 2024: Edwin Allen High
- 2025: Hydel High School
- 2026: Edwin Allen High

== Champs Today ==
The merged Champs is now a five-day event, featuring thousands of Jamaican athletes competing in four age classes for girls and three for boys as follows:
Boys
Class 1 : under 19
Class 2 : under 15
Class 3 : under 13

Girls
Class 1 : under 19
Class 2 : under 16
Class 3 : under 14
Class 4 : under 12 Competitions takes place in 100 m, 200 m, 400 m, 800 m, 1500 m, 3000 m (girls only), 5000 m, 4 × 100 m, 4 × 400 and medley relays, hurdles – 110 m, 100 m, 70 m (girls only), high jump, long jump and triple jump, pole vault, discus throw, shot put, javelin throw and the heptathlon.

Competitions takes place in 100 m, 200 m, 400 m, 800 m, 1500 m, 3000 m (girls only), 5000 m, 4 × 100 m, 4 × 400 and medley relays, hurdles – 110 m, 100 m, 70 m (girls only), high jump, long jump and triple jump, pole vault, discus throw, shot put, javelin throw and the heptathlon.

Numerous students who have competed at the Champs meeting have gone on to global success. Triple Olympic/World gold medalist and world record holder Usain Bolt first came to the fore in 2002, after failing to win any events in the Class 3 age group. Olympic champions Veronica Campbell-Brown, and Shelly-Ann Fraser suffered defeats in the lower age groups at the meet before finally winning for their school teams. Three-time 100 m world record-holder and World/Olympic gold medalist (4 × 100 m) Asafa Powell competed, but never became a household name at the high school level because he was disqualified in the Class 1 100m final. The 2016 Double Olympic Champion Elaine Thompson also competed, only ever finishing fourth in the 100 m at the Class 2 level. Other top performers at Champs who have gone on to excel on the world stage include Michael Frater, Bert Cameron, Melaine Walker, Winthrop Graham, Beverly McDonald, Maurice Wignall, Juliet Cuthbert, Sandie Richards and Raymond Stewart.

Although the high school competition developed world-class talent such as Olympic stars Arthur Wint and Herb McKenley, Una Morris and Vilma Charlton, then Lennox Miller, Donald Quarrie and Merlene Ottey, Champs was virtually unknown to mainstream international media until the emergence of a disproportionate number of world-class sprinters from Jamaica in the Olympic Games and IAAF World Championships in Athletics. American college coaches in particular were very aware of the richness of the competitor pool, since they annually traveled to Kingston to scout for junior college and NCAA-level talent. Several top performers at Champs such as British high jumper Germaine Mason are former Jamaican high school stars. Jamaican-born American sprinter Sanya Richards competed at the meet for Immaculate Conception High School before migrating to the US in 1997.

== Championships records ==
=== U-19 Boys ===
Event	Record	Athlete/Team	High School	Date	Age	Ref
100 m	9.99 (+0.3 m/s)	Bouwahjgie Nkrumie	Kingston College	29 March 2023	19 years, 42 days	
200 m	20.25 (+1.9 m/s)	Usain Bolt	William Knibb Memorial	5 April 2003	16 years, 227 days	
400 m	44.93	Akeem Bloomfield	Kingston College	28 March 2015	17 years, 198 days	
800 m	1:48.58	Chevonne Hall	Edwin Allen High	15 May 2021	19 years, 88 days	
1500 m	3:45.54	Kemoy Campbell	Bellefield High	26 March 2010	19 years, 72 days	
5000 m	14:18.55	Kemoy Campbell	Bellefield High	27 March 2010	19 years, 73 days	
110 m hurdle	13.09	Wayne Pinnock	Kingston College	30 March 2019	18 years, 158 days	
400 m hurdle	49.50	Roshawn Clarke	Camperdown High	8 April 2022	17 years, 282 days	
2000 m Steeplechase	5:49.46	Rodgers Aryamanya	Kingston College	22 March 2018	17 years, 117 days	
1600 m sprint medley relay	3:24.22	C Rowe J Black K McPherson K Dewar	Kingston College	24 March 2018		
4 x 100 m relay	39.08		Calabar High	28 March 2015		
4 x 400 m relay	3:06.76		Calabar High	28 March 2015		
High jump	2.23 m	Christoff Bryan	Wolmer's Boys	29 March 2014	17 years, 338 days	
Long jump	8.05 m	Wayne Pinnock	Kingston College	27 March 2019	18 years, 155 days	
Pole vault						
Triple jump	16.66 m	Jaydon Hibbert	Kingston College	8 April 2022	17 years, 82 days	
Shot put	20.65 m	Kevin Nedrick	Petersfield High	1 April 2017	19 years, 81 days	
Discus throw	67.55 m	Joseph Salmon	Jamaica College	26 March 2026	18 years, 186 days	
Javelin throw	70.30	Addison James	Edwin Allen High	28 March 2026	18 years, 188 days	

=== U-19 Girls ===
Event	Record	Athlete/Team	High School	Date	Age	Ref
100 m						
200 m						
400 m						
800 m						
1500 m						
100 m hurdle						
4 x 100 m relay						
High jump						
Long jump						
Triple jump	13.52 m (+0.4 m/s)	Kimberly Williams	Vere Technical	28 March 2007	18 years, 145 days	
Shot put						
Discus throw						

=== U-15 Boys ===
Event	Record	Athlete/Team	High School	Date	Age	Ref
100 m						
200 m						
400 m						
800 m						
1500 m						
110 m hurdle						
400 m hurdle						
4 x 100 m relay						
High jump						
Long jump						
Triple jump	15.54 m (+1.4 m/s)	Michael-Andre Edwards	Jamaica College	23 March 2024	16 years, 126 days	
Shot put						
Discus throw						

=== U-16 Girls ===
Event	Record	Athlete/Team	High School	Date	Age	Ref
100 m	11.16 (+0.9 m/s)	Kevona Davis	Edwin Allen	23 March 2018	16 years, 93 days	
200 m						
400 m						
800 m						
1500 m						
110 m hurdle						
400 m hurdle						
4 x 100 m relay						
High jump						
Long jump						
Triple jump						
Shot put						
Discus throw						

=== U-13 Boys ===
Event	Record	Athlete/Team	High School	Date	Age	Ref
100 m						
200 m						
400 m						
800 m						
1500 m						
100 m hurdle						
400 m hurdle						
4 x 100 m relay						
High jump						
Long jump						
Triple jump						
Shot put						
Discus throw						

=== U-14 Girls ===
Event	Record	Athlete/Team	High School	Date	Age	Ref
100 m						
High jump	1.83 m	Zavien Bernard	Hydel High	21 March 2024		
Shot put	16.44 m	Kimeka Smith	St. Jago High	20 March 2024		
