= PC Format =

Former UK computer magazine (1991–2015)

- June 1992 cover
- Editor: Alan Dexter
- Categories: Computer magazine
- Frequency: Every four weeks, 13 per year
- Circulation: 6,249 (2012); 8,009 (2011); 9,318 (2010); 11,914 (2009); 18,003 (2008)
- First issue: October 1991
- Final issue: 2015
- Company: Future plc
- Country: United Kingdom
- Based in: Bath
- Language: English
- Website: www.pcformat.co.uk
- ISSN: 0963-5521

PC Format was a computer magazine published in the United Kingdom by Future plc, and licensed to other publishers in countries around the world. In publication between 1991 and 2015, it was part of Future plc's Format series of magazines that include articles about games, entertainment and how to get the most out of the platform. Despite the occasional mention of alternatives, PC Format takes the term 'PC' to mean a Microsoft Windows-based computer.

== Details ==
Aimed at a reader with an age of around 30, PCF was far more irreverent and opinionated than its competition, edging it towards being a lifestyle magazine as well as a computing one. In its earlier days, it promoted itself as a PC entertainment magazine - meaning it was not aimed at the business market, and it was not aimed at solely games. This included content such as video editing, animation, web design, and others - many of which were not very common on the PC at the time.

PC Format included a cover disk or cover CD, similar to many other computer magazines. Initially these were in 5¼" and 3½" inch floppy disk formats; this standard progressed to CD-ROM and DVD-ROM as technology advanced.

PC Format prided itself on being unbiased with its reviews, and frequently gave low scores to blockbuster games its reviewers considered poor quality. It used the full range of 0-100% for its game reviews, rather than having 50% for a bad game and 100% for a great game. The magazine rarely awarded anything between 30% and 50%, showing radical scores for games with the belief mediocre games are difficult to review. Scores over 90% were very rarely granted. If a game scored above 90% it received a PCF Gold award. Before the magazine was redesigned in January 2007, the magazine also awarded 80% plus scores with a high score or top gear award.

Immediately prior to PC Format's launch, the Format series encompassed three platforms - Commodore Format, ST Format and Amiga Format. The magazines in the 'Format' series on the date of its last publication were MacFormat (launched 1993), Linux Format (launched 2000), and PC Format; as of 2025 only MacFormat is still published.

PCFormat's website was part of the TechRadar.com network of sites, Future plc's technology portal.

== Content ==
The main content of the magazine included previews and reviews of the latest games, software and hardware reviews, computing news, a wide range of tutorials and a technical help section. It also included left-field and investigative features on wider computing culture. Since the final redesign, the magazine focused more on games (PLAY) and performance hardware (WIRED), instead of the greater range previously explored. There was then also a much greater emphasis on Overclocking and Modding articles, keeping in line with the new performance hardware and gaming focus.

The magazine gradually shifted its focus away from games, concentrating more on hardware. As of the September 2010 issue, typically no more than four games were reviewed each month.

== Format as of January 2007 ==
- Download: Technology and PC news, previously included monthly Guerrilla Testing for solving often irrelevant computing issues. (For example: What are the best gloves to wear whilst fitting a graphics card?)
- Upload: Readers' letters and monthly competition.
- Play: Games previews and reviews. Included features such as in-depth guides, recommended games and a "Replay" review.
- Wired: Hardware reviews, included a main in-depth supertest comparison with benchmarks, a smaller "roundup" group test and technology previews. As of 2008, PC modding features; overclocking tips, "I Am The Mod", Quick Fix tutorials and custom hardware guide found in the now defunct "HOTWIRED" section are found here.
- Features: Not an individual section of the magazine, but every issue came with in-depth game or hardware articles that were featured in either Play or Wired.
- Regular items:
  - Welcome
  - Disc Pages
  - Ask Luis: Readers' computing questions were answered by Technology writer Luis Villazon. Includes "Luis and Ned" cartoon strip.
  - Jim's Black Hole: Science News (previously Jackass Science)
  - Next Month preview

== Final Team ==
- Editor: Alan Dexter. Past editors include Adam Ifans, Bob Wade, Mark Higham, Dan Slingsby, Adam Oxford, Dan Hutchinson, James Binns and Richard Longhurst.
- Art Editor: Paul Blachford
- Deputy Editor: Dave James
- Operations Editor: Chris Thornett
- Reviews Editor: Matt Hanson
- New Media Editor: Jeremy Ford
- Technology Writers: Jeremy Laird, Luis Villazon,
- Regular contributors: Simon Crisp, Phil Iwaniuk, Neil Mohr, Henry Winchester
