= Milo (video game) =

1995 video game

MILO
- Cover art
- Developer: Crystalvision Software
- Publisher: Sibling Interactive
- Programmer: Max Elliott
- Artist: Max Elliott
- Composer: Warren Dale
- Platforms: Windows, Windows 3.x
- Release: 1995 (Windows); Dec 31, 1996 (Windows 3.x)
- Genre: adventure-puzzle
- Mode: Single player

MILO is a first-person adventure-puzzle computer game that challenges the player to solve 14 puzzles based in the world of MILO, an artificially intelligent computer. The game was developed by Crystalvision Software and released in 1996. Released in the wake of such titles as Myst and Pandora's Box, MILO was billed as a multimedia game and as an early example of 3D gaming. The 16-track ambient soundtrack is composed by noted progressive rock musician, Warren Dale.

== Development ==
According to Four Fat Chicks, this game is an example of "minute titles, released to less than no fanfare, inexplicably floating around on Ebay, unrecognized and forgotten".

== Plot ==
A puzzle awaiting the player.

The player is placed in the abandoned planet of an ancient and highly advanced civilization. This civilization had discovered the Keys to the Gateway of the Universe and as a consequence they had abruptly left their planet in a state of enlightenment to travel and search the far corners of the universe for even greater mysteries. The one thing this civilization left behind was MILO - the sentient artificial intelligence designed to act as caretaker for their planet while they were gone and guard for the Keys to the Gateway.

MILO has existed now for centuries, patiently awaiting the return of his creators. The lack of interaction with life during the intervening centuries, however, has been difficult for MILO on a mental level. By the time of the player's arrival on the planet, MILO has unfortunately lost much of its normal function and is now quite mad. Your task as the player is to unlock the Library which holds the Keys to the Gateway. To do this, you must solve a series of 14 puzzles often taking the form of a 2-person logic game with MILO (acting remotely through the electronic world) as your opponent. Upon completion of the all 14 puzzles, the player meets MILO face to face, and escapes the planet.

== Gameplay ==
Gameplay sees the player access seven different worlds from a central hub, with puzzle completion leading to progression through the game. The backgrounds are static slideshows.

== Reception ==
The game was well received by critics, earning praise especially for its graphics, sound, and replay value. The reliance on luck rather than logic in some of the puzzles, as well as the near-total lack of documentation accompanying the game, however, was criticized. The sound effects were also criticized (apart from the musical score) as lacking in quality and substance. Four Fat Chicks likened the game's look and feel to Gord@k and L-Zone, and recommended the game to fans of puzzle adventure games such as Jewels of the Oracle, The Cassandra Galleries, or Pandora's Box. Michael J. Bertrand of World Village praised the New Age background music as one of the very few enjoyable aspects of the game. The Adrenaline Vault's Hermann K. Peterscheck felt the game ripped off puzzles from Myst and The 7th Guest.
