= Miles Jones =

Miles Jones may refer to:

- Miles Jones (footballer) (born 1987), English-born Barbadian footballer
- Miles Jones (musician) (born 1983), Canadian hip hop/soul musician

== See also ==
- Myles Jones (born 1993), American lacrosse player
