= Miles Smith =

Miles Smith is the name of:

- Miles Smith (bishop) (1554–1624), English theologian, Bishop of Gloucester
- Miles Staniforth Cater Smith (1869–1934), Australian politician and colonial administrator
- Miles Smith (historian) (born 1983), American historian
- Miles Smith (sprinter) (born 1984), American sprinter

See also

- Miles Smith Farm, beef farm in Loudon, New Hampshire
- Myles Smith, British singer
