= Miles Robinson =

Miles Robinson may refer to:

- Miles Robinson (cricketer) (1929–2002), English cricketer
- Miles Robinson, a fictional member of the Sesame Street Robinson family
- Miles Benjamin Anthony Robinson, singer-songwriter
- Miles Robinson (soccer) (born 1997), American soccer player
