= 2026 World Athletics U20 Championships – Men's triple jump =

Men's triple jump at the 2026 World Athletics U20 Championships
- Venue: Hayward Field
- Dates: 6 August (Qualification); 7 August (Final)
- Competitors: 38 from 27 nations
- Winning distance: 17.08 m

Medalists
gold medal	Michael-Andre Edwards	Jamaica
silver medal	Miles Nesmith	United States
bronze medal	Wang Zhuoyue	China

The men's triple jump at the 2026 World Athletics U20 Championships was held at Hayward Field in Eugene, United States on 5 and 7 August 2026.

== Records ==
U20 standing records prior to the 2026 World Athletics U20 Championships were as follows:

Record	Athlete & Nationality	Mark	Location	Date
World U20 Record	Jaydon Hibbert (JAM)	17.75	Kingston, Jamaica	1 June 2024
Championship Record	Jaydon Hibbert (JAM)	17.22	Cali, Colombia	5 August 2022
World U20 Leading	Giann Carlos Baxter (CUB)	16.80	Havana, Cuba	5 June 2026

== Results ==
=== Qualification ===
Qualification took place in the morning session on 6 August 2026.Athletes attaining a mark of at least 16.00 metres (Q) or at least the 12 best performers (q) qualified for the final.

==== Group A ====
Rank	Athlete	Nation	Round			Mark	Notes
Rank	Athlete	Nation	1	2	3	Mark	Notes
1	Miles Nesmith	United States	15.63 (±0.0 m/s)	16.41 (+1.3 m/s)		16.41 m (+1.3 m/s)	Q, PB
2	Wang Zhuoyue	China	x	16.07 (+1.5 m/s)		16.07 m (+1.5 m/s)	Q
3	Francesco Efeosa Crotti	Italy	15.47 (+1.7 m/s)	16.05 (+0.5 m/s)		16.05 m (+0.5 m/s)	Q
4	Precious Ebitimi Opinion	Nigeria	14.96 (+0.9 m/s)	16.02 (−0.9 m/s)		16.02 m (−0.9 m/s)	Q, PB
5	Michael-Andre Edwards	Jamaica	16.00 (+1.2 m/s)			16.00 m (+1.2 m/s)	Q
6	Cai Ziqi	China	15.78 (+0.2 m/s)	15.92 (−0.9 m/s)	15.77 (+0.7 m/s)	15.92 m (−0.9 m/s)	q
7	Yevhen Zhmailo	Ukraine	15.67 (−0.4 m/s)	15.73 (−0.1 m/s)	x	15.73 m (−0.1 m/s)	q
8	Benjamin da Silva	Brazil	15.69 (+0.6 m/s)	15.38 (+1.6 m/s)	15.38 (−0.3 m/s)	15.69 m (+0.6 m/s)	q
9	Jhon Valencia	Colombia	15.41 (+1.0 m/s)	x	15.53 (+2.4 m/s)	15.53 m (+2.4 m/s)	
10	Daniel Okerenyang	Australia	14.47 (−0.9 m/s)	15.48 (+1.6 m/s)	15.50 (+0.1 m/s)	15.50 m (+0.1 m/s)	
11	Sean-Connor Atafo	Great Britain	15.23 (+0.7 m/s)	15.26 (+0.3 m/s)	15.41 (+1.7 m/s)	15.41 m (+1.7 m/s)	
12	P. Royshan	India	14.48 (+1.7 m/s)	14.52 (+1.6 m/s)	15.20 (+0.9 m/s)	15.20 m (+0.9 m/s)	
13	Benedikt Maurer	Germany	x	15.08 (±0.0 m/s)	13.57 (+0.8 m/s)	15.08 m (±0.0 m/s)	
14	Kristiano Perez	Trinidad and Tobago	x	15.02 (+1.9 m/s)	x	15.02 m (+1.9 m/s)	
15	Han Gyeol	South Korea	x	14.96 (+1.0 m/s)	14.70 (+1.2 m/s)	14.96 m (+1.0 m/s)	
16	Meddhy Varnere	France	14.95 (+1.5 m/s)	x	14.79 (+0.3 m/s)	14.95 m (+1.5 m/s)	
17	Yahia Mahdi	Algeria	x	14.74 (+1.0 m/s)	14.38 (+1.1 m/s)	14.74 m (+1.0 m/s)	
18	Hansana Jayasingha Ilandari	Sri Lanka	14.16 (+0.4 m/s)	14.72 (+1.2 m/s)	14.04 (+0.1 m/s)	14.72 m (+1.2 m/s)	
19	Marco Mangani	Italy	14.16 (+0.2 m/s)	14.53 (+0.2 m/s)	14.40 (−0.2 m/s)	14.53 m (+0.2 m/s)	

==== Group B ====
Rank	Athlete	Nation	Round			Mark	Notes
Rank	Athlete	Nation	1	2	3	Mark	Notes
1	Krzysztof Rybnik	Poland	15.60 (+1.1 m/s)	x	15.91	15.91 m	q
2	Zakaria Ghezali	Algeria	15.43 (+0.1 m/s)	15.82 (+0.1 m/s)	x	15.82 m (+0.1 m/s)	q
3	Zinga Barbosa Firmino	Bulgaria	15.20 (+1.5 m/s)	15.81 (+0.8 m/s)	15.74 (−0.4 m/s)	15.81 m (+0.8 m/s)	q, SB
4	Nicolas Izidoro da Silva	Brazil	x	15.30 (+1.1 m/s)	15.72 (+0.3 m/s)	15.72 m (+0.3 m/s)	q
5	Lian Anagnostopoulos	Australia	15.45 (±0.0 m/s)	15.55 (+1.8 m/s)	15.62 (+0.4 m/s)	15.62 m (+0.4 m/s)	PB
6	Rekelme Hunter	Jamaica	15.24 (−0.1 m/s)	x	15.40 (+0.6 m/s)	15.40 m (+0.6 m/s)	
7	Yoel Pérez	Spain	x	14.25 (+1.4 m/s)	15.38 (+0.9 m/s)	15.38 m (+0.9 m/s)	
8	Thehara Ravishka Fernando Salpadoruge	Sri Lanka	14.59 (+2.5 m/s)	15.35 (+1.9 m/s)	x	15.35 m (+1.9 m/s)	
9	Gora Ndiaye	France	x	15.34 (+0.3 m/s)	13.86 (+0.8 m/s)	15.34 m (+0.3 m/s)	
10	Jaden Stewart	Canada	15.32 (+1.5 m/s)	x	15.21 (+0.9 m/s)	15.32 m (+1.5 m/s)	
11	Mátyás Bella	Hungary	14.33 (+0.2 m/s)	14.81 (+1.7 m/s)	15.24 (+0.2 m/s)	15.24 m (+0.2 m/s)	
12	Dimitrios Moumouris	Greece	14.84 (+1.1 m/s)	15.23 (+0.9 m/s)	15.12 (+1.3 m/s)	15.23 m (+0.9 m/s)	
13	Tito Odunaike	Great Britain	14.72 (+0.1 m/s)	15.02 (+0.8 m/s)	15.21 (−0.1 m/s)	15.21 m (−0.1 m/s)	
14	Satoshi Inoue	Japan	14.61 (−0.5 m/s)	x	14.88 (+1.3 m/s)	14.88 m (+1.3 m/s)	
15	Gleb Gladilov	Kazakhstan	14.69 (−1.3 m/s)	14.14 (+1.6 m/s)	14.75 (−0.6 m/s)	14.75 m (−0.6 m/s)	
16	Dhanush Raj	India	14.53 (−0.2 m/s)	14.71 (+0.6 m/s)	–	14.71 m (+0.6 m/s)	
17	Manuk Hovhannisyan	Armenia	14.40 (+1.5 m/s)	x	x	14.40 m (+1.5 m/s)	SB
—	Kelvin Kipngeno Bii	Kenya	x	x	x	NM	
—	Justin Arogundade	United States	x	x	x	NM	

=== Final ===
The final took place in the afternoon session on 7 August 2026.

Place	Athlete	Nation	Round						Mark	Notes
Place	Athlete	Nation	#1	#2	#3	#4	#5	#6	Mark	Notes
1st place, gold medalist(s)	Michael-Andre Edwards	Jamaica	13.76 (+1.4 m/s)	15.21 (+0.9 m/s)	16.23 (−0.3 m/s)	16.08 (−0.6 m/s)	16.71 (−0.5 m/s)	17.08 (+1.1 m/s)	17.08 m (+1.1 m/s)	WU20L
2nd place, silver medalist(s)	Miles Nesmith	United States	16.32 (+1.7 m/s)	15.83 (+1.1 m/s)	–	16.54 (+0.9 m/s)	16.79 (+1.0 m/s)	15.89 (+0.5 m/s)	16.79 m (+1.0 m/s)	PB
3rd place, bronze medalist(s)	Wang Zhuoyue	China	x	15.68 (+0.2 m/s)	16.36 (+0.9 m/s)	14.62 (+0.6 m/s)	x	r	16.36 m (+0.9 m/s)	
4	Francesco Efeosa Crotti	Italy	16.01 (+0.6 m/s)	16.24 (+0.5 m/s)	16.08 (−0.3 m/s)	x	15.92 (±0.0 m/s)	16.15 (+0.6 m/s)	16.24 m (+0.5 m/s)	PB
5	Cai Ziqi	China	15.74 (+0.1 m/s)	15.73 (+1.9 m/s)	16.04 (±0.0 m/s)	15.89 (+0.3 m/s)	15.67 (+0.3 m/s)	16.12 (+0.7 m/s)	16.12 m (+0.7 m/s)	PB
6	Zinga Barbosa Firmino	Bulgaria	15.47 (+0.9 m/s)	15.54 (+0.6 m/s)	15.96 (+1.3 m/s)	x	15.60 (+1.3 m/s)	15.53 (−0.8 m/s)	15.96 m (+1.3 m/s)	PB
7	Precious Ebitimi Opinion	Nigeria	15.06 (+1.3 m/s)	15.27 (+0.6 m/s)	15.46 (+0.9 m/s)	15.82 (+1.5 m/s)	15.63 (+0.2 m/s)		15.82 m (+1.5 m/s)	
8	Benjamin da Silva	Brazil	x	x	15.71 (+0.5 m/s)	x	15.73 (+0.9 m/s)		15.73 m (+0.9 m/s)	
9	Yevhen Zhmailo	Ukraine	15.14 (−0.2 m/s)	15.51 (+0.6 m/s)	15.70 (+0.8 m/s)	x			15.70 m (+0.8 m/s)	
10	Zakaria Ghezali	Algeria	x	15.10 (+0.4 m/s)	15.47 (+0.9 m/s)	15.59 (+0.4 m/s)			15.59 m (+0.4 m/s)	
11	Krzysztof Rybnik	Poland	15.19 (+0.3 m/s)	x	14.96 (+0.8 m/s)				15.19 m (+0.3 m/s)	
12	Nicolas Izidoro da Silva	Brazil	x	x	15.15 (+0.4 m/s)				15.15 m (+0.4 m/s)	
