= Jethro Robinson =

English cricketer

Personal information
- Full name: Jethro Frederick Robinson
- Born: 10 November 1914; Eastbourne, Sussex, England
- Died: 22 May 2001 (aged 86); Canada
- Batting: Unknown
- Bowling: Slow left-arm orthodox
- Relatives: Miles Robinson (brother)

Domestic team information
- Years: Team
- 1936: Cambridge University
- 1935–1936: Sussex

Career statistics
| Competition | First-class |
|---|---|
| Matches | 3 |
| Runs scored | 11 |
| Batting average | 2.75 |
| 100s/50s | 0/0 |
| Top score | 5 |
| Balls bowled | 383 |
| Wickets | 8 |
| Bowling average | 20.75 |
| 5 wickets in innings | 2 |
| 10 wickets in match | 0 |
| Best bowling | 5/47 |
| Catches/stumpings | 3/– |
- Source: Cricinfo, 9 January 2012

Jethro Frederick Robinson (10 November 1914 – 22 May 2001) was an English cricketer. Robinson's batting style is unknown, though it is known he was a slow left-arm orthodox bowler. He was born at Eastbourne, Sussex, and educated at The King's School, Canterbury.

He made his first-class debut for Sussex against Cambridge University in 1935. He made a further first-class appearance for Sussex against Cambridge University in 1936, taking his career best figures of 5/47 in this match. He also studied at the University of Cambridge in 1936, making a single first-class appearance for the university in that same year against the touring Indians.

He died in Canada on 22 May 2001. His brother, Miles, also played first-class cricket.
