= Nathan Judah ben Solomon =

Provençal Jewish physician and scholar (f. 14th century)

Nathan Judah ben Solomon was a Provençal Jewish physician and scholar of the fourteenth century. His Provençal names were En Bongodas and Bonjues and he was probably a native of Avignon, where lived many other members of the Nathan family. Judah, like all the other members of his family, added to his father's name the formula "of the race of Ben Jesse," which is probably an allusion to the house of David, from which several Provençal families claimed to be descended.

Nathan devoted himself chiefly to the translation of scientific works from the Arabic into Hebrew. His translations, which are still extant in manuscript, were:

- Kelal Ḳazer meha-Sammim ha-Nifradim, a medical work of Ibn Abi Salt Umayya ben 'Abd al-'Aziz of Denia; in his preface Nathan says that he began the translation of this work in his youth at the request of his master Rabbi Isaac Nathan ben Kalonymus
- Kawwenot ha-Filosofim, a treatise on philosophy by Ghazali.
- Marashut ha-Rosh, a medical work of Ibn Wafid (ib. No. 2129)
- Ha-Dibbur be-Yenot, an abbreviated translation of the treatise "De Vinis" of Arnaud of Villeneuve.
- treatise on fevers, compiled from Bernard de Gordon and Gilbert.

Nathan was also the author of an original work entitled Iggeret (Letter), defending the study of philosophy against the attacks of the Orthodox.

== See also ==
- Miles of Marseilles
