= Máel Muire =

Máel Muire or Máelmuire or Maolmhuire is an Irish unisex name meaning "devotee of Mary". It was often Anglicized as Miles, Miler, Milo, or Myles.

Notable people with the name include:

== Men ==
- Máel Muire (bishop of the Scots), possible 10th-century bishop of Cennrígmonaid, modern-day St Andrews
- Máel Muire mac Céilechair (died 1106), Irish cleric and scribe at the monastery of Clonmacnoise
- Máel Muire, Earl of Atholl, early 12th century Scot ruler
- Maolmhuire Mag Raith (c. 1523 – 1622), Irish prelate also known by the Anglicized name Miler or Miles Magrath

== Women ==
- Máel Muire ingen Cináeda, daughter of Kenneth MacAlpin and wife of two Irish kings, died 913
- Máel Muire ingen Neill, died 966
- Máel Muire bean Flainn, fl. late 9th century
- Máel Muire ingen Amlaíb, Queen of Ireland, died 1021
