= MacLife =

American magazine for Apple products

- Cover of the July 2024 issue
- Editor: Nick Odantzis
- Categories: Mac and iOS computing
- Frequency: monthly
- First issue: September 1996 (as MacAddict); February 2007 (as MacLife)
- Company: Future US
- Country: United States
- Based in: South San Francisco, CA
- Language: English
- Website: www.maclife.com
- ISSN: 1935-4010

MacLife (stylized as Mac|Life) is an American monthly magazine published by Future US. It focuses on products produced by Apple, including the Macintosh personal computer, iPad, and iPhone. It was sold as a print product on newsstands, but is now a digital-only product distributed through Magazines Direct and the Mac|Life app, the latter of which can be obtained via the App Store. From September 1996 until February 2007, the magazine was known as MacAddict.

== History ==
MacLife is one of two successor magazines to the defunct CD-ROM Today. First published in 1993 by Imagine Publishing (now Future US), CD-ROM Today was targeted at both Windows and Macintosh users, and each issue shipped with a CD-ROM of shareware and demo programs. In August 1996, CD-ROM Today ceased publication, with two magazines taking its place: MacAddict for Macintosh users, and boot (later Maximum PC, now defunct) for Windows users.

As was the case with CD-ROM Today, MacAddict's discs included shareware and demo programs, but also came with other added features, such as staff videos and previews of content inside the magazine's hard copy. The MacAddict website was updated daily with news relevant to Apple products. MacAddict also had a mascot, a stick-figure named Max. By 1998, MacAddict had surpassed Macworld as the Macintosh magazine with the highest consumer newsstand spending due to its $7.99 cover price.

In February 2007, MacAddict was relaunched as MacLife. The new magazine had physically larger print editions than the old magazine, was focused on the creativity of Mac users, and no longer came with a CD-ROM.

In April 2023, MacLife issued its last print edition and switched to a digital-only format.

In Germany, an unrelated magazine of the same name is published by Falkemedia from Kiel (ISSN 1860-9988).

== Reviewing system ==
From 1996 to mid-2002, there were four rating icons, which depicted Max. There was "Blech" (the lowest), "Yeah, Whatever" (a mediocre product), "Spiffy" (a solid yet imperfect product), and "Freakin' Awesome" (the highest). From 2002 to 2009, it was replaced with a more conventional five-point system. In 2010, MacLife adopted a 10-point system that included half stars.

== See also ==
- MacFormat – sister publication published in the United Kingdom
