= Isaac Nathan ben Kalonymus =

French Jewish philosopher and controversialist

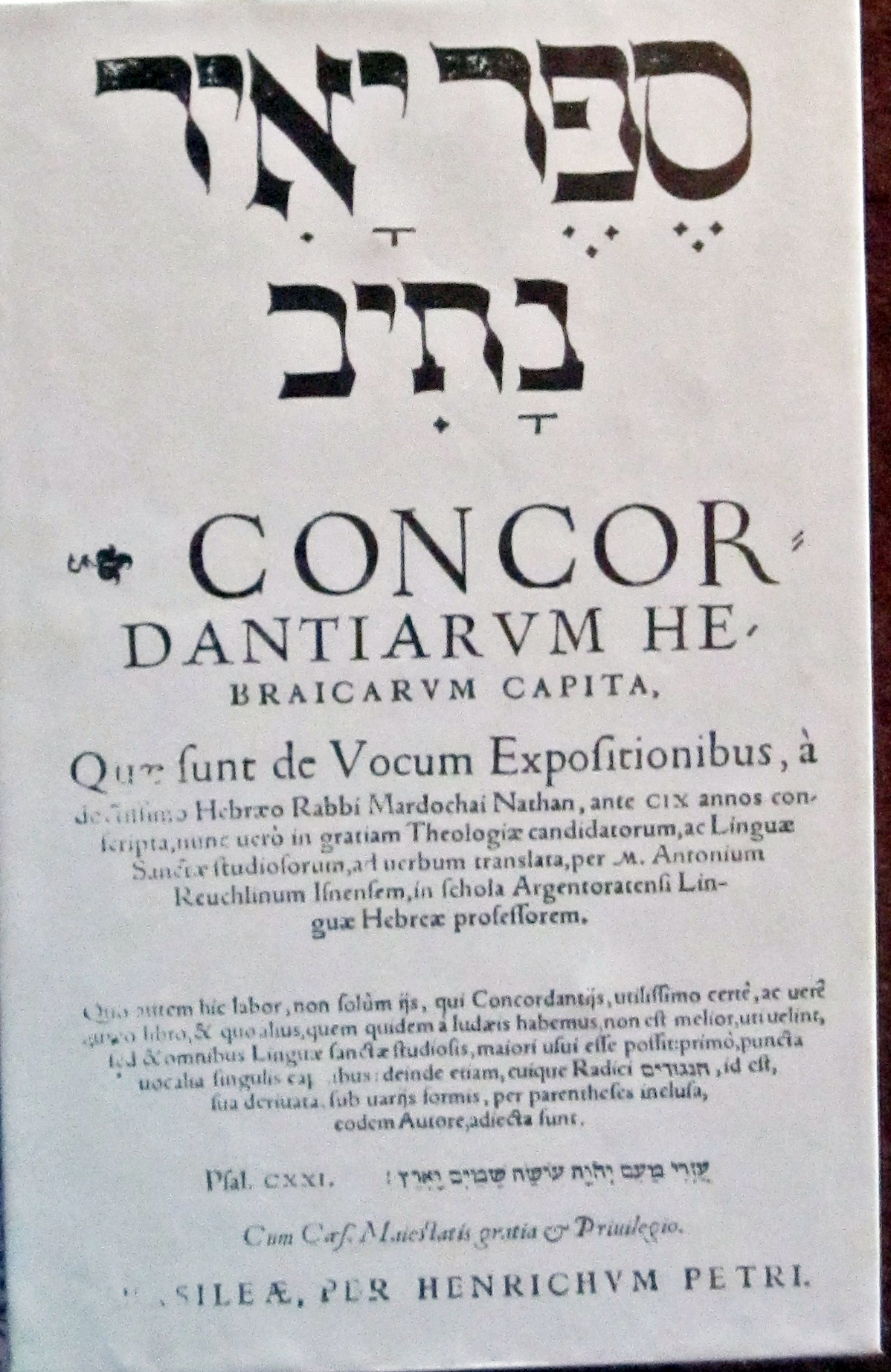

Isaac Nathan ben Kalonymus was a French Jewish philosopher and controversialist. He lived at Arles, perhaps at Avignon also, and in other places in the fourteenth and fifteenth centuries.

He belonged to the well-known Nathan family, which claimed its descent from David; he was probably the grandson of the translator Maestro Bongodas Judah Nathan. According to the statement of Isaac himself, in the introduction to his concordance (see below), he was completely ignorant of the Bible until his fifteenth year, his studies having been restricted to the Talmud and to religious philosophy.

Later he took up other branches of learning, and owing to his frequent association with Christians and to the numerous anti-Jewish writings of Jewish apostates that appeared at that time, he turned his attention to religious controversy.

== Works ==
Isaac Nathan ben Kalonymus was the author of the following Jewish apologetic works (some are still extant, and some are known only through citations):

- Tokaḥat Mat'eh, against Joshua Lorki (Geronimo de Santa Fé after baptism)
- Mibẓar Yiẓḥaḳ, counter-missionary anti-Christian polemics
- Me'ah Debarim, for the instruction of youth, twenty-one essays on various topics, the Biblical names of God forming one, another being on the Masorah
- Me'ammeẓ Koaḥ, on virtue and vice, in three parts
- Meïr Netib, a Hebrew Biblical concordance upon which the author worked from 1437 to 1447
  - with a philosophico-exegetical introduction (Petiḥat Meïr Netib) containing a Jewish refutation of the arguments contained in the epistle of the fictitious Samuel of Morocco, who endeavored to demonstrate from the Jewish Bible the Messiahship of Jesus (introduction to Nathan's concordance)

=== Concordance of the Hebrew Bible ===
The Meïr Netib was the first Bible concordance in Hebrew, and was distinguished from the similar Latin work of Arlotus of Prato in that its vocabulary was arranged in the order of the roots. In the introduction the author says that his work aimed to facilitate the study of Biblical exegesis and to prevent Jewish converts to Christianity from making, in their religious controversies, incorrect quotations from the Bible, as was often the case with Geronimo de Santa Fé. The "Meïr Netib," with its complete introduction, was first published at Venice (erroneously under the name of Mordecai Nathan) in 1523; in 1556 it was published at Basel by Antoine Reuchlin (printed by Henri Pierre), but with only a part of the introduction.
