= Gord@k =

1996 video game

- Developer: Hoffmann Interactive
- Publishers: I. Hoffmann & Associates
- Producer: Isabel Hoffmann
- Designers: Daniel Riley; Stephen G. Haines; Steve Schorsch
- Artist: Daniel Riley
- Platforms: Microsoft Windows; Mac OS
- Release: November 15, 1996
- Genre: Point-and-click adventure
- Mode: Single-player

Gord@k is a 1996 point-and-click adventure video game published by I. Hoffmann & Associates. Taking place in a first-person, Myst-style 3D virtual environment, the player assumes the role of a secret operative working to defeat Gord@k, an intelligent agent turned computer virus. It was the first adult-oriented video game developed by Hoffmann & Associates, previously a producer of multimedia software and interactive storybooks. It received mixed reviews.

== Gameplay and plot ==
Gord@k takes place in a first-person, Myst-style 3D virtual environment.

In Gord@k, the player character assumes the role of a secret operative working for CS Corporation. CS Corporation is hired by the animation studio CelGen Corporation to eliminate Gord@k, a sophisticated and lethal computer virus responsible for the presumed deaths of three previous operatives. The player must navigate a dangerous virtual reality environment created by CelGen in order to capture Gord@k. The introductory sequence involves a simulated desktop environment on a computer system. Upon booting up the computer, the player receives a mission briefing via email, followed by a voice message delivered by Agent James Road, the director of CS Corporation. The player can then access dossiers regarding prior operatives who failed the mission.

The gameplay transitions into a first-person, Myst-like 3D virtual environment, where players navigate a nonlinear path toward Gord@k's lair through 360-degree rotation. Interaction is driven by a point-and-click interface, requiring players to pixel hunt for interactive hotspots, collect inventory items, and solve environmental puzzles. Additionally, players must collect tokens to operate the Superview, a machine that enables the player to view future events, furthering the player's chances of completing the mission.

As the story unfolds, the player discovers entries from the journals of Lewis Laceter, a senior executive at CelGen. Laceter is identified as the architect of Gord@k, which was originally an experimental intelligent agent deployed in a test environment. According to Laceter's journal entries, the project resulted in the collapse of the CelGen Corporation after Gord@k breached containment, subsequently evolving into a computer virus that destroyed the company's infrastructure. Laceter's notes reveal that Gord@k's personality was synthesized from the descriptions of an artist, a mathematician, and a game show host, resulting in an artificial intelligence described as superintelligent, unpredictable, and remorseless.

== Development ==
Gord@k was the first 3D video game developed by I. Hoffmann & Associates, Inc., a Toronto-based multimedia software and interactive storybooks. It was also the first game developed by Hoffmann Interactive, a division of the company dedicated to video games for pure entertainment. It came on one CD-ROM and was compatible with both Mac OS and Microsoft Windows. Unlike Hoffmann & Associates's earlier video game titles, which were educational and primarily aimed at children, Hoffmann Interactive aimed their games at teenagers and young adults. The concept for Gord@k was conceived by the founder of Hoffmann & Associates, Isabel Hoffmann, while the game was designed by Daniel Riley, Stephen G. Haines, and Steve Schorsch.

Gord@k made heavy use of QuickTime VR, a plugin for QuickTime developed by Apple which allowed for the creation and viewing of VR photography. The game's 3D environments were modeled, animated, and rendered with Alias's PowerAnimator 3D software on Silicon Graphics workstations. These pre-rendered environments and animations were then transferred onto Macintosh computers, where they were stitched into 3D panoramas using QuickTime VR. The resulting QuickTime VR files were further compiled into the game, which was programmed using C++ and Macromedia Director's Lingo programming language. According to PC Graphics & Video, Gord@k was the first video game developed using this combination of QuickTime VR and PowerAnimator.

In lieu of a fully digital workflow, Gord@k's developers initially crafted its mechanics and plot tree on paper. Following completion of the outline, the game's developers drew storyboards for each environment and laid them out onto a flowchart showing every possible action that can be taken by the player. As every action requires a new panorama to be modeled, the game's developers ran into the limitations of the CD-ROM format, mainly its storage capacity, requiring the developers to limit the number of actions that can be taken within a panorama to between three and four. After finalizing the flowchart of the game, the sketches were modeled in 3D by the Alias artists, who had to produce their own detailed textures using their own photographs on top of using off-the-shelf texture packs.

Once the 3D environments were finalized, the artists rendered out 360-degree panning animations of each environment and stitched together overlapping features to create 3D panoramas for use with QuickTime VR. Transitional animations, such as the player character traveling through a scene, were animated as standard cutscenes, and—through a complicated process of alignment and testing across Adobe Photoshop, Director, and QuickTime—made to transition seamlessly with the panoramas. To facilitate programming in Director, the developers created multilayered Photoshop templates over the environments, where specific colors are applied to a transparent top layer to define the coordinates and dimensions of interactive hotspots.

== Release and reception ==
Reception

Review scores
Publication	Score
MacFormat	67%
Quandary Computer Game Reviews	1/5

Gord@k was released on November 15, 1996. In Canada, Hoffmann Interactive reached a deal with Corel to distribute the game. It received a muted reception in MacFormat, where writer Josse Bilson praised the graphics and presentation as superb but panned the relative lack of interactivity. He opined, "Soon you're left with a feeling of being shepherded towards a goal rather than searching for clues to fulfill your mission. The twin ramifications of this are that it won't take you long to complete and, once you have done it, there's little incentive to do it all again". Bilson also took umbrage with the somber tone of the soundtrack and the Blade Runner–esque interface, writing that they felt out of place with some of the exaggerated animations of the environment and the cartoonish sound effects: "It would have worked better if the game's producer had decided early on whether it was intended to be deadly serious or tongue-in-cheek". He appreciated the environmental puzzles and wrote that the tools the player collects in tandem with the modes of transportation the player uses were fun elements. He concluded that, "despite its looks, the adventure within this game simply isn't as engaging or as exciting as it should be".

CD-Action was slightly more positive, with journalist Peter Pan comparing the game to Myst, Blue Ice, and A.D. 2044 in its use of surreal environments. Unlike Bilson, Pan found the sound effects non-distracting and praised the soundtrack. He called the plot "mercilessly linear", however, and wrote that a large part of the gameplay involved walking around through corridors and constantly clicking on random locations looking for hotspots. He called the puzzles "(mostly) not difficult" and found the game's pacing brisk. He concluded his review saying that, for avid mystery fans and "people who want to play adventure games different from the norm, Gord@k will be a hit". For Quandary Computer Game Reviews, author Steve Ramsey was highly critical of the game, calling the ending puzzle nearly impossible to beat and the game overall frustrating and crash-prone.
