= Miles Stapleton =

Miles Stapleton may refer to:

- Miles Stapleton, 1st Lord Stapleton (died 1314)
- Miles Stapleton of Bedale (died 1364)
- Miles Stapleton (died 1466)
