= Miles Robinson (cricketer) =

English cricketer

Personal information
- Full name: Miles Trevor Robinson
- Born: 13 December 1929; Eastbourne, Sussex, England
- Died: 28 September 2002 (aged 72); Hinton St George, Somerset, England
- Batting: Left-handed
- Bowling: Right-arm medium-fast
- Relatives: Jethro Robinson (brother)

Domestic team information
- Years: Team
- 1947: Sussex

Career statistics
Competition	First-class
Matches	2
Runs scored	4
Batting average	2.00
100s/50s	0/0
Top score	4
Balls bowled	258
Wickets	0
Bowling average	–
5 wickets in innings	0
10 wickets in match	0
Best bowling	–
Catches/stumpings	0/–
- Source: Cricinfo, 10 January 2012

Miles Trevor Robinson (13 December 1929 – 28 September 2002) was an English cricketer. Robinson was a left-handed batsman who bowled right-arm medium-fast. He was born at Eastbourne, Sussex, and educated at Shrewsbury School.

Robinson made two first-class appearances for Sussex in 1947 against Lancashire at The Saffrons, Eatbourne, and Gloucestershire at the County Cricket Ground, Hove. He batted once against Lancashire, being dismissed in this match for a duck by Jack Ikin, while against Gloucestershire he also batted once, scoring 4 runs before being dismissed by Monty Cranfield. He also bowled a total of 43 overs in these two matches, going wicketless in both.

He died at Hinton St George, Somerset on 28 September 2002. His brother, Jethro, also played first-class cricket.
