= Miles Smith Farm =

Beef farm in New Hampshire, United States

Coordinates: 43.3402°N 71.4839°W

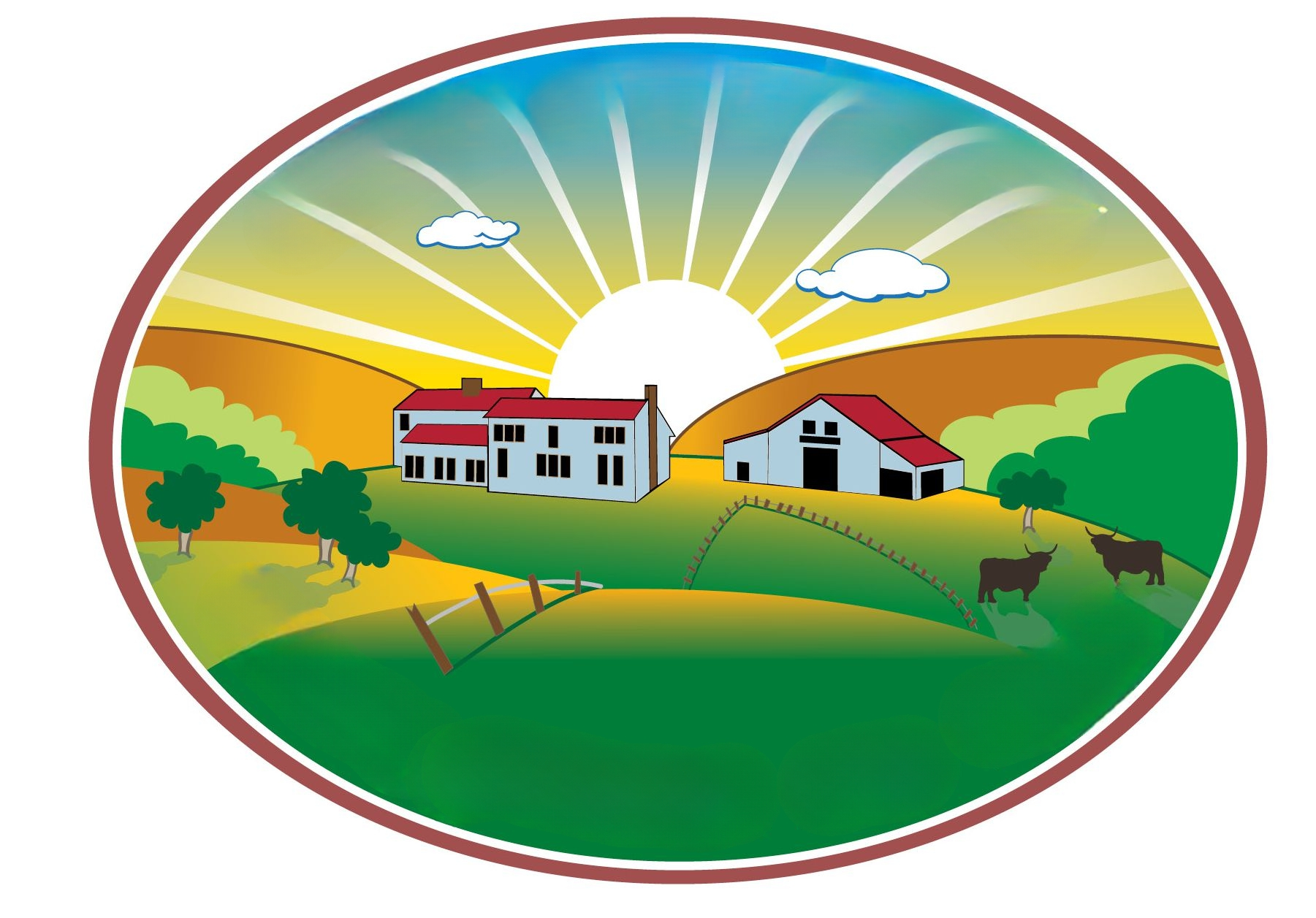
- Industry: Private Residence
- Founded: 1850
- Founder: Miles Smith
- Headquarters: Loudon, New Hampshire, U.S.
- Area served: United States
- Products: Short-term rentals
- Owner: Bruce Dawson; Carole Soule
- Website: www.milessmithfarm.com

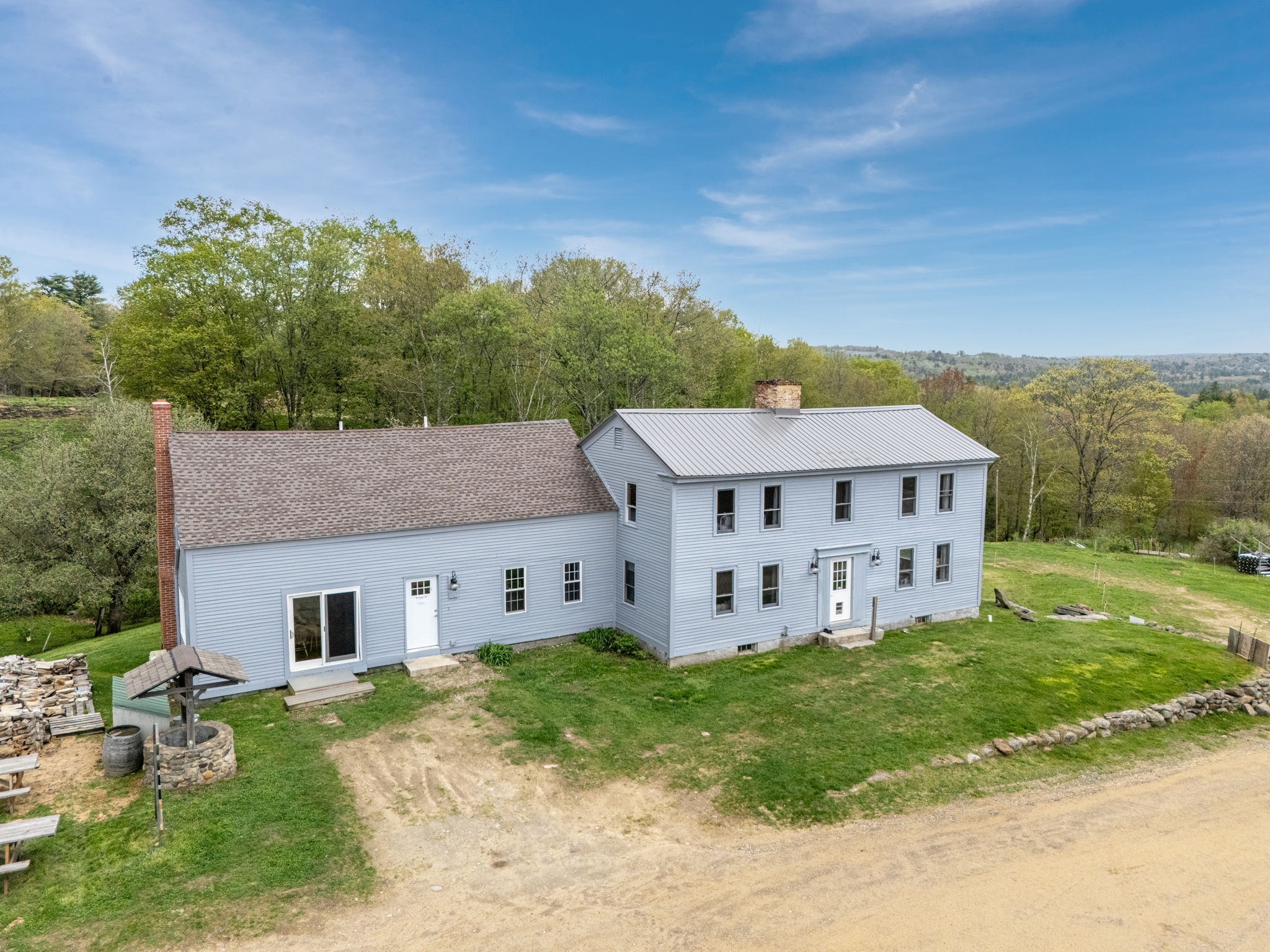
This farm house, built in the 1850s by Miles Smith, has been renovated is a private residence.

Miles Smith Farm is a family-owned farm located on Whitehouse Road (New Hampshire Route 106) in Loudon, New Hampshire, United States. Currently a working family farm with stonewalls built by the original owner, Miles Smith, its 26 acres (11 ha) have a panoramic view of the Merrimack Valley to the southwest.

Miles Smith Farmhouse is a private residence.

== Description ==
=== History ===
Miles Smith first farmed the area in 1830. He was a stonemason by trade, helping the neighboring Shakers with their stonework and providing food from his dairy cattle, goats, and pigs. Smith knew the area well and farmed extensively, becoming the town of Loudon's hog reeve and field driver. Smith now resides in the cemetery on the farm along with others who have farmed the area over the years.

In 1918, Sarah Adeline Whitehouse bought the property. Whitehouse was a midwife who helped to bring over 45 children into the world, and she was also known as the "best shot in Loudon" and filled the farmhouse attic with deer antlers.

In 2002, the current iteration of Miles Smith Farm was founded with just two pregnant Scottish Highland cows. In 2005, the first beef sales were made at a local cooperative market and a solar-powered store on the farm property opened in 2011. And in 2012, the first short-term rental unit was opened.

In the past, the farm recovered over 200 acres of off-pasture farmland, including land belonging to St. Paul's School. St. Paul's strongly supports local agriculture and the local economy by making some of its unused land available to local farmers. The New Hampshire Audubon manages the land and also provides a natural habitat for grassland birds such as grasshopper sparrows and eastern meadowlarks.

In 2018, Miles Smith Farm participated in a program to extend the time when their cattle can graze from four to six months a year up to eight months a year by allowing the cattle to feed on turnips during the colder months.

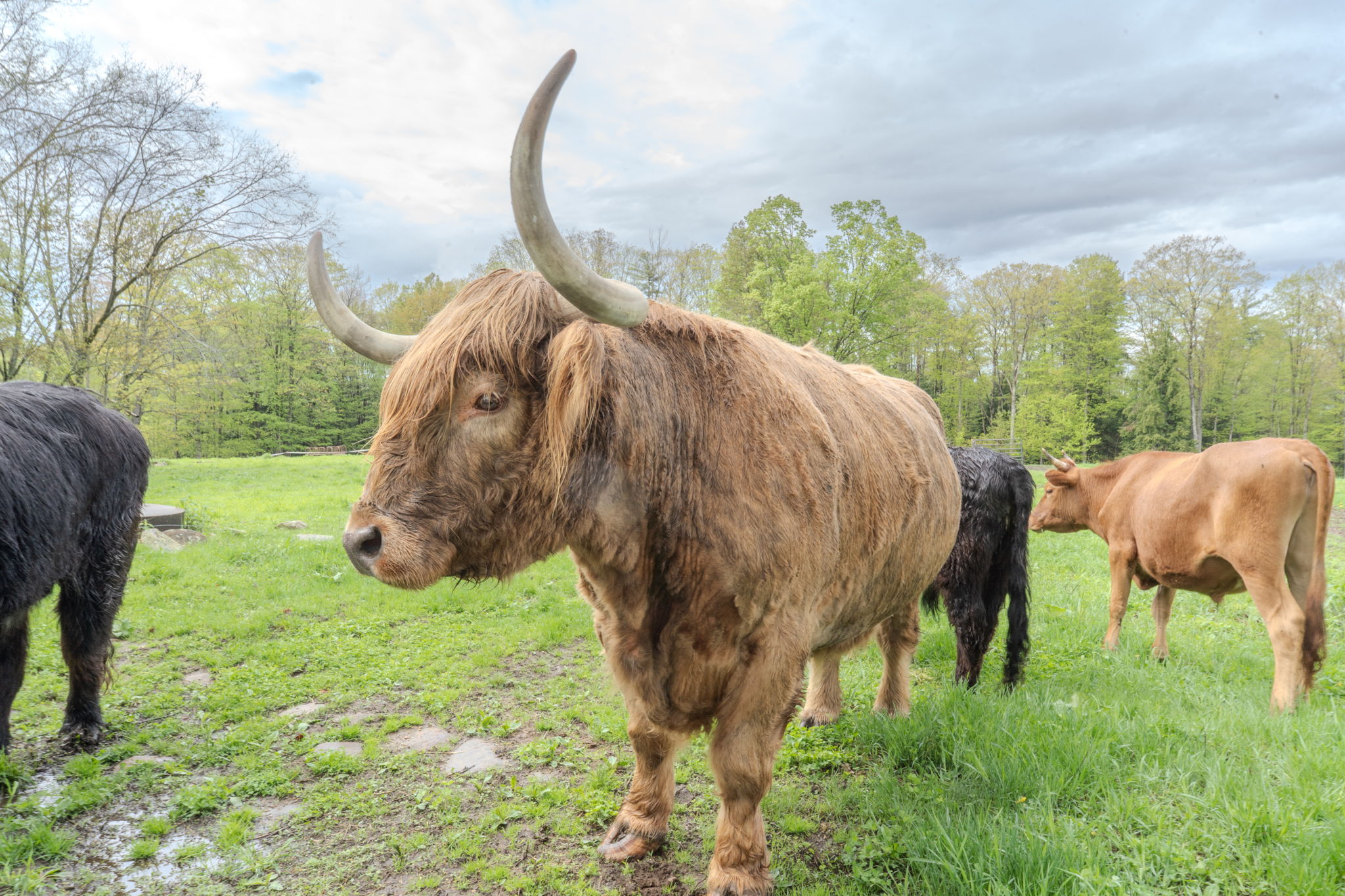
Miles Smith Farm is famous for its friendly Scottish Highland cattle.

The farm store closed in 2024 and is now a private residence.

== Marketing and distribution ==
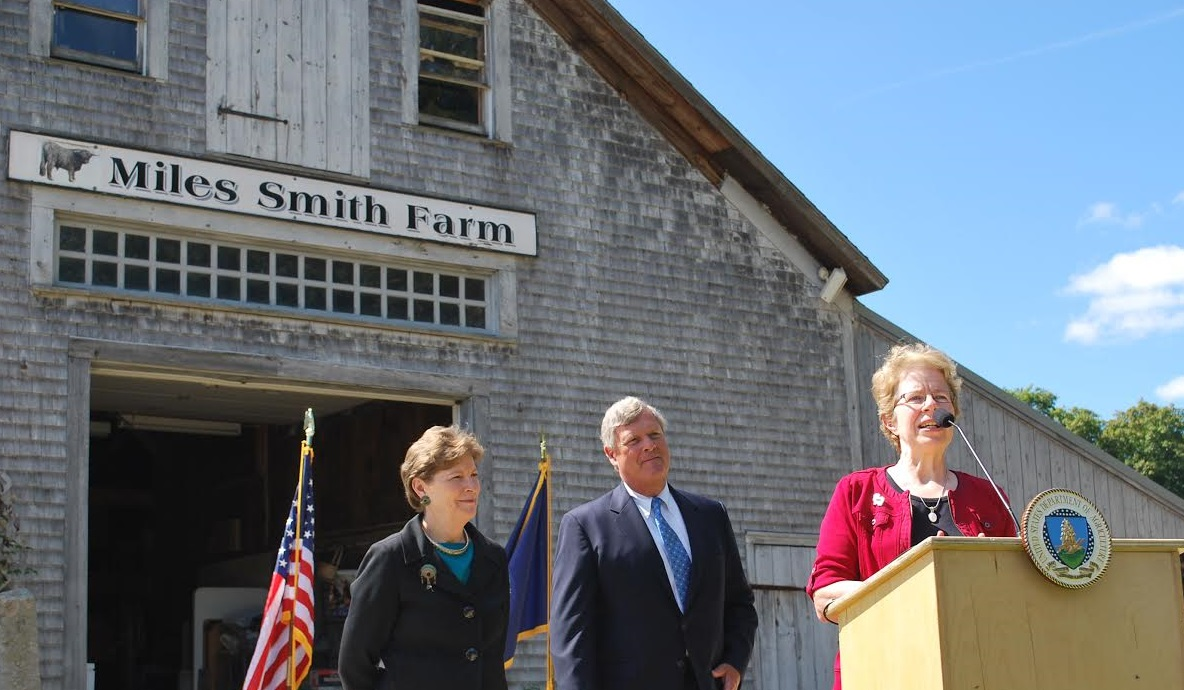
Senator Jeanne Shaheen with U.S. Agriculture Secretary Tom Vilsack and New Hampshire Agriculture Commissioner Lorraine Merrill announcing a grant that helps local farms turn commodities into value-added products.

=== School program ===
In 2011, the farm started selling beef to the Gilford, New Hampshire School District, which was looking for fresh, locally grown, and healthier food to serve to the students and staff. The Concord School District, Oyster River Cooperative School District, and Seabrook, New Hampshire school systems followed in 2013.

=== USDA grant ===
In August 2014, the United States Department of Agriculture awarded the farm a $127,000 grant to produce and market local burgers made from a blend of grass-fed beef and pork. The grant was part of the 2008 Farm Bill given to nearly farms 250 in the United States to help farmers generate new products, create and expand marketing opportunities, and increase income.

== Awards ==
- Carole Soule, the co-owner of Miles Smith Farm, was voted one of New Hampshire Magazine's Remarkable Women 2014.

== Book ==
Carole Soule is also the author of the children's book, The Curious Little Calf Named Bleu, published in 2012. ISBN 9780988729704 and, Yes, I Name Them, A Memoir, published in 2023. ISBN 979-8-9884625-0-7

== See also ==
- Highland cattle

== Gallery ==
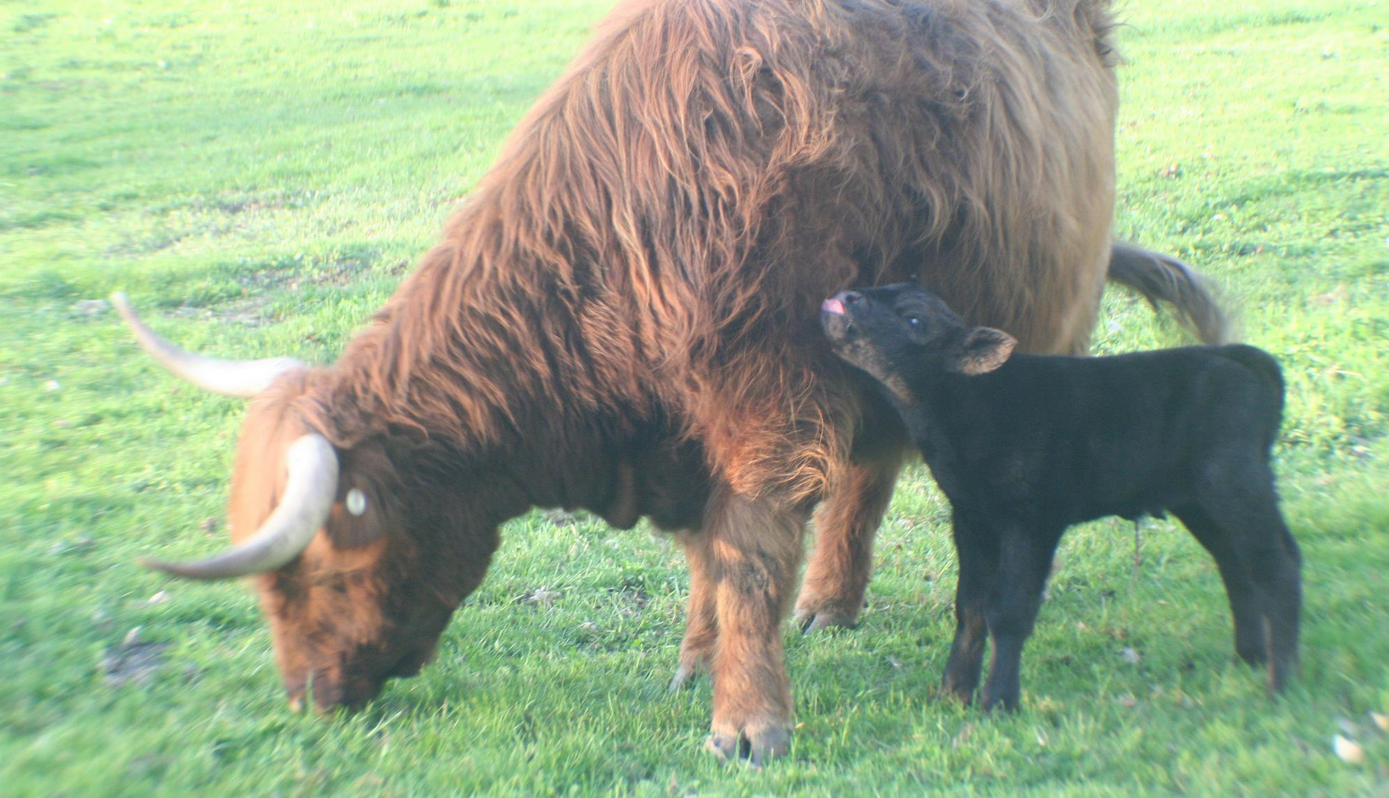
Highland cow with newborn calf

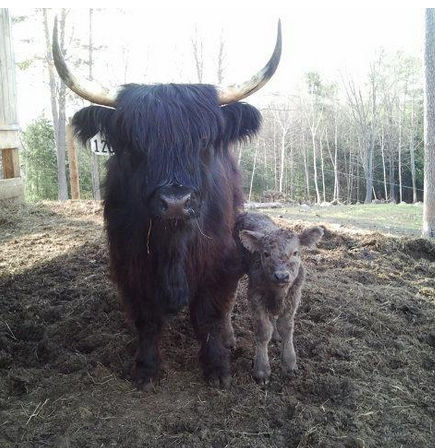
Mother and calf
