= Mylo (disambiguation) =

Mylo (born 1978) is a Scottish electronic musician and record producer.

Mylo may also refer to:

- Mylo, North Dakota
- mylo (Sony), a Sony portable, Skype-compliant, Wi-Fi messaging device

== People ==
- Mylo Hubert Vergara (born 1962), Filipino bishop
- Justin Mylo (born 1995), Dutch DJ

== See also ==
- Mylo Xyloto, album by Coldplay
- Milo (disambiguation)
