= Michael-Andre Edwards =

Jamaican athlete (born 2007)

Personal information
- Nationality: Jamaican
- Born: 18 November 2007 (age 18)

Sport
- Sport: Athletics
- Events: Long jump, Triple jump
- College team: Kansas State Wildcats

Achievements and titles
- Personal bests: Triple Jump 17.08m (2026); Long Jump 7.71m (2026)
Medal record
Men's athletics
Representing Jamaica
World U20 Championships
Gold medal – first place	2026 Eugene	Triple jump
CARIFTA Games (U20)
Gold medal – first place	2025 Port of Spain	Long jump
Gold medal – first place	2026 St George's	Triple jump
Silver medal – second place	2025 Port of Spain	Triple jump
Silver medal – second place	2026 St George's	Long jump

Michael-Andre Edwards (born 18 November 2007) is a Jamaican track and field athlete who specializes in the Jumps. He won a gold medal in the triple jump at the 2026 World Athletics U20 Championships.

== Biography ==
Edwards attended Jamaica College in St. Andrew, Jamaica. In the fall of 2026, he will join the jumps team at Kansas State University in the US under coach Clive Pullen.

== Career ==
At the 2025 ISSA Grace Kennedy boys and girls Championship he won gold for JC in both the triple jump 15.38m (-0.6) and the long jump 7.75m. In 2026 at the national high school championship, he again claimed the double winning the triple jump by bettering his previous mark to a 16.25m PB and the long jump in 7.71m. The triple jump achievement made him one of the best junior jumpers in the world.

=== 2025 ===
At the CARIFTA Games in Trinidad, Michael garnered gold in the long jump in 7.41m and silver in the triple jump in 15.66m behind compatriot Chavez Penn.

=== 2026 ===
In April 2026, Edwards competed at the 2026 CARIFTA Games and won a gold medal in the triple jump and a silver medal in the long jump.

He then competed at the 130th Penn Relays Carnival and broke the 10-year-old high school boys' triple jump record while representing Jamaica College during the second day of the competition with a personal best jump of 16.29 metres.

In July 2026, he was selected to represent Jamaica at the 2026 World Athletics U20 Championships. He advanced to the finals in the triple jump and won the title.
