= Miles Nesmith =

American athlete (born 2008)

Personal information
- Nationality: American
- Born: February 21, 2008 (age 18)

Sport
- Sport: Athletics
- Events: Triple jump, Long jump
Medal record
Men's athletics
Representing the United States
World U20 Championships
Silver medal – second place	2026 Eugene	Triple jump

Miles Nesmith (born February 21, 2008) is an American track and field athlete.

== Early life and education ==
Nesmith attended Central High School in Memphis, Tennessee. He was named the Gatorade Tennessee Boys Track and Field Player of the Year in 2025. During his junior year he won the high jump and triple jump at the Class 3A state meet. During the triple jump he set a state record with a jump of 51 feet, 7.5 inches. During the high jump at the Tennessee Association Championships he recorded a jump of 7 feet, 2.5 inches, which ranked No. 5 nationally at the time of his selection and put him at No. 2 on the state's all-time list. He won the national title in the long jump at the Nike Outdoor Nationals and earned the silver medal in the triple jump.

During his senior year he won the long jump and triple jump at the Class AAA state meet. He won the gold medal in the triple jump at the USATF Under-20 Championships. He also set a state record in the triple jump of 53 feet, 1 inch at the Penn Relays Carnival, a jump that ranked No. 1 nationally among prep boys competitors and No. 12 in prep history. He was subsequently named the Gatorade Tennessee Boys Track and Field Player of the Year for the second consecutive year.

== Career ==
In August 2026, Nesmith competed at the 2026 World Athletics U20 Championships and won a silver medal in the triple jump with a personal best jump of 16.79 meters. This was the best American finish in the event since 1994. He broke the US National High School Record, surpassing the previous record 16.72 meters set by Kenny Hall in 2004. He also became the first high school athlete to eclipse 55 feet in the triple jump.
