= Miles Scott =

Miles Scott may refer to:

- Batkid (Miles Scott; born 2008), American child and cancer survivor
- Miles Scott (American football) (born 2002), American football safety
