= Miles Taylor =

Miles Taylor may refer to:

- Miles Taylor (politician) (1805–1873), U.S. Representative from Louisiana
- Miles Taylor (historian) (born 1961), British historian
- Miles Taylor (security expert) (born 1986 or 1987), author of once-anonymous book criticizing Donald Trump
- Miles Taylor (born 2000), presenter of the YouTube channel Miles in Transit
