= Miles Jones (footballer) =

Barbadian footballer (born 1987)

Personal information
- Date of birth: 17 December 1987 (age 38)
- Place of birth: Kingston, England
- Positions: Striker; winger

Senior career*
Years	Team	Apps	(Gls)
2004–2006	Woking	0	(0)
2006–2007	Hayes	6	(0)
2006	→ Corinthian-Casuals (loan)	11	(0)
2007	Hayes & Yeading	3	(0)
2007	Aldershot Town	0	(0)
2007–2008	Waltham Forest	11	(2)
2008–2010	Harrow Borough	18	(4)
2010	Beaconsfield SYCOB		
2010–2011	Northwood	12	(2)
2012	Thatcham Town		
2012–2013	Beaconsfield SYCOB		
2013	Chalfont St Peter	1	(0)

International career^{‡}
2008–2013	Barbados	5	(1)
- * Club domestic league appearances and goals as of 20:55, 6 February 2016 (UTC) ‡ National team caps and goals as of 20:55, 30 September 2008 (UTC)

Miles Jones (born 17 December 1987) is an English-born Barbadian former footballer who played as a striker. He has been a member of the Barbados national team.

== Career ==
Jones started his career at Brentford as a youth player and was there for 5 years. He went on to sign for Woking in the Conference National in 2004, playing in the youth and the reserves. Then towards the end of the season he made his first appearance at the age of 16, against Stevenage Borough. Jones went on to make 2 more appearances for Woking.

In 2006, Jones left Woking to join Hayes in the Conference South. He announced his arrival with a solo goal, followed by an authentic Barbadian gymnastic routine, against Watford during the pre-season. Jones went on to make six appearances before going on loan to Corinthian-Casuals due to limited first team chances, Jones's first game for Casuals against Dartford, where he received the man of the match. He went on to play another 10 games for Corinthian-Casuals, becoming affectionately known as 'Judge Dredd'.

Jones signed for Hayes & Yeading in August 2007, and made his debut on 15 September, against Weling United, receiving the man of the match award.

In November 2007, Jones left Hayes & Yeading United to sign for Aldershot Town. He made his debut in the Hampshire Senior Cup against Christchurch where he went on to gain the man of the match award.

The following month, he went out to the United States and trialled with Los Angeles Galaxy, doing well enough to be invited back for training at a time that was to be agreed in the future.

After a spell at Harrow Borough and a short stay at Beaconsfield SYCOB, Jones signed for Northwood in December 2010 remaining with the team until 2011.

Jones then had a short spell with Thatcham Town in 2012, in which he lined up against his former side Northwood.

The midfielder then had a second spell at Beaconsfield SYCOB before signing briefly for Chalfont St Peter in 2013.

== International career ==
In September 2007, Jones earned a call up to Barbados under-23 squad to play in the Olympics qualifiers taking place in Aruba between 7–14 September. Jones scored on his debut against Aruba and went on to play against Jamaica and Antigua & Barbuda.

Jones has been selected to play in the Barbados national team for the 2008 CONCACAF World Cup qualifiers.

In June 2008, Jones was called up to the Barbados senior team to play against Bermuda in the warm up games for the World Cup qualifier against United States. Jones started both the games against Bermuda but didn't play against United States due to immigration issues.
