= MILO (bootloader) =

In computing, a MILO, or the Alpha Linux Mini Loader, is a firmware replacement for early Alpha AXP hardware that allows the system to boot the Alpha version of the Linux operating system. It is capable of running Linux device drivers and reads available filesystems rather than looking for boot blocks. Newer Alpha hardware uses aboot.
