= Miles of Marseilles =

Provençal-Jewish physician and philosopher (f. 14th century)

Miles of Marseille was a Provençal-Jewish physician and philosopher of the Middle Ages. He was born at Marseille around 1294. In some manuscripts, he is designated by the name "Bongodos," the Provençal language the equivalent of "ben Judah."

From early youth, he devoted himself to the study of science and philosophy. While still young he left his native place for Salon-de-Provence, where he studied astronomy under the direction of Abba Mari Senior Astruc de Noves. In 1322 he was imprisoned at Beaucaire together with other Jews in the tower of Rodorte. Later he sojourned successively at Murcia, Tarascon, Aix, and Montélimar.

Miles became known through his Hebrew language translations from the Arabic of scientific and philosophical works. These include:

1. Ha-She'elot ha-Dibriyyot meha-Derushim Asher le-Filusufim, translation of questions or dissertations concerning some obscure points in the commentary of Averroes on certain parts of the "Organon," finished May 8, 1320;
2. translation of the Middle Commentary of Averroes on Aristotle's Ethics completed at Beaucaire Feb. 9, 1321;
3. translation of the commentary of Averroes on Plato's Republic finished Sept. 3, 1321, at Beaucaire, in the tower of Rodorte;
4. translation of the compendium made by Averroes of Aristotle's Organon, completed at Tarascon Dec. 13, 1329;
5. translation of the text of the figures 30 and 31 of the treatise of Euclid on the five bodies (in completion of the translation of Kalonymus, where these figures are wanting), finished Aug. 23, 1335;
6. commentary on the Almagest, parts i.-iii.;
7. translation of a compendium of the "Almagest" by Abu Mohammed Jabar ibn Aflah, translated from the Arabic into Hebrew by Jacob ben Machir and corrected by Miles, finished Dec. 17, 1335, at Aix;
8. Ma'amar Alexander ha-Firdusi, the treatise of Alexander of Aphrodisias on the soul, translated from the Greek into Arabic by Ishaq ibn Hunain, finished July 4, 1340, at Montélimar;
9. "Ma'amar be-Tenu'at ha-Kokabim ha-Ḳayyamim," the treatise on the movement of the fixed stars by Abu Ishaq al-Zarkala.
10. translation of the astronomical works of the vizier Abu Abdallah Mohammed ibn Mu'adh of Seville, in two parts:

- treatise in seven chapters on the eclipse of the sun on July 3, 1079;
- Iggeret be-'Ammud ha-Shahar, the treatise on the aurora;

== See also ==
- Nathan Judah ben Solomon
