= Milo, Kenya =

Coordinates: 0°32′N 34°43′E

== Introduction ==
Milo is a sub-location in Sitikho Location of Bungoma County, Kenya. It is headed by Emmanuel Murokoyo. It is located approximately 34 degrees east of the Greenwich Meridian and 30 minutes north of the equator. It is bordered by the Nzoia and Muji rivers. The area is heavily populated, with agriculture being the main economic activity: Maize, millet, sorghum, beans, bananas and sugarcane are some of the crops produced in this area. The population also engages in fishing, livestock keeping and bodaboda operations.

== Academic Performance ==
Academically, Milo boasts of having good schools. For example, in 2010, Milo Central Academy was ranked third in Western province and tenth in the whole country with a mean score of 387.59 out of 500. It emulated Milo secondary school, which was 45th nationally three years earlier.
