= MacFormat =

British magazine

- Cover of the December 2024 issue
- Editor: Rob Mead-Green
- Categories: Computing / Mac
- Frequency: Monthly
- Circulation: 20,000-25,000
- First issue: June 1993
- Company: Future plc
- Country: United Kingdom
- Based in: Bath, Somerset
- Language: English
- ISSN: 0968-3305

MacFormat is the UK's biggest computer magazine aimed at Macintosh users. It published 13 issues per year. It is published by Future plc, and has been since 1993.

== Content ==
The main content of this magazine includes news from major Apple events such as the WWDC, features detailed tutorials and reviews of the latest accessories and apps. Until 2012, the magazine included a free cover disc filled with Mac software mentioned in the magazine. In previous years, MacFormat came with programs on a free 3½-inch (88.9 mm) Floppy disk, CD or CD/DVD option as reflected the state of cheap removable media in that era.

== Animations ==
The cover-disc hosted several animations designed by Phil Elliott for MacFormat, from 1996 to 2000. Most notably the Jonni Starr series, with Elliott doing the animations and Darryl Cunningham writing the story.

== Editorial team ==
- Editor: Rob Mead-Green
- Managing Art Editor: Paul Blachford
- Operations Editor: Jo Membery

== See also ==
- MacLife – sister publication published in the United States
