= Freight claim =

Legal demand against a shipment carrier

A freight claim or cargo claim is a legal demand by a shipper or consignee against a carrier in respect of damage to a shipment, or loss thereof.

Typically, the claimant will seek damages (financial compensation for loss), but other remedies include "specific performance", where the cargo-owner seeks delivery of the goods as agreed. At common law, any carrier has a duty to act with reasonable despatch. A "common carrier" may have strict liability, but normally the standard of care is only one of "due diligence", or acting "properly and carefully".

== Legal aspects ==
The purpose of a freight claim is for the carrier to reimburse the shipper / consignee so as to put them in the position is if the carriage had been properly had carried out according to the bill of lading. For this reason, claimants are generally expected to file a claim to recover their costs, excluding profits. In very rare cases some profits may be recoverable, but a court will normally consider lost profits as non-recoverable economic loss.

In most cases, redress will be paid by the carrier's insurer or P&I Club, and so the law of insurance will determine quantum of damages. Loss is deemed either "total" (either "actual" or "constructive") or "partial". If the insurance policy is a "valued policy", the amount agreed is, in the absence of fraud, conclusive (except in cases of "constructive total loss", when the true market value prevails).

Under contract law, claimants are obliged to take reasonable measures to mitigate loss. For example, if the damaged product has retained some value, the carrier would only be required to pay for the difference between the original value and the damaged value. The claimant would then be free to salvage the damaged product by selling it at a reduced cost.

The consignee is entitled to inspect the goods, and to reject them if they are damaged or fail to comply with description. The inspection should take place at the first reasonable place and opportunity; this will often be at the consignee's depot or place of business. At the time of delivery, the consignee should examine the shipment for loss or damage, and should note any issues on the delivery receipt; this will be used as evidence to back up the claim.

If significant evidence of loss or damage is noticed on delivery, the consignee will be entitled to reject the shipment, and may also have the option to cancel the entire contract.

If the consignee signs off on the delivery receipt but the damage is concealed (or "latent" or "hidden") and is discovered only subsequently, a claim will still be allowed provided it is made within a reasonable time. In this case, the shipper or consignee must show that the damage was indeed caused by the carrier, rather than by the shipper or consignee.

The carrier will normally require the shipper to pay freight (the "shipment invoice") in advance; otherwise a"clean" bill of lading will not be issued, and the document will declare "Freight Not Paid". In the event of loss or damage, the consignee would file a freight claim against the carrier for (i) damages to cover the loss and (ii) reimbursement of any freight paid. The shipper will not be able to make any claim except as an agent of the consignee.

== Carrier liability ==
The extent of the carrier's liability may depend upon the shipping mode and the governing bodies. The Carmack amendment states that motor or rail carriers are liable for the full loss. Conversely, the US COGSA states that the carrier is liable for no more than $500 per package.

In the case of import/export transactions international conventions on limitation of liability may apply.

Article IV of the Hague-Visby Rules lists more than 17 exclusions of the carrier's liability. Other international conventions such as the Hague Rules, the Hamburg Rules and the Rotterdam Rules have similar provisions exempting liability.

Perhaps the four main scenarios in which a carrier is not deemed liable for damage to goods are:

- Act of nature
- Act of the public enemy
- Fault of the shipper
- Defects in the goods themselves

== Filing a freight claim ==
Each carrier typically provides a standard form specifically for filing freight claims. However, by law, no particular form is necessary, as long as the following four details are present:

- The shipment must be specified
- The loss or damage type must be specified
- The total of the amount claimed must be specified
- A clear demand for payment must be present

Information to identify the shipment may include the freight bill PRO #, the vehicle number, and the delivery date.

In addition to this basic information, the following documentation should also be provided:

- Shipment invoice
- Delivery receipt
- Bill of lading
- Invoice showing the value of the product being claimed
- Invoices for costs incurred (i.e. repairs or replacements of the product)

Additional supporting documentation may also be included or required.

=== Filing deadlines ===
Different rules and filing deadlines will apply depending on the shipping mode. This is due to differences in how specific shipping modes are governed.

Rail and motor carriers are governed by the Carmack Amendment. The Carmack Amendment states that claimants have a minimum of 9 months from the date of delivery to file a freight claim.

Conversely, ocean carriers that service the US are governed by the Carriage of Goods by Sea Act (COGSA). This act requires that claimants file a claim within 3 days of delivery.

== See also ==
- Law of Carriage of Goods by Sea
- Hague-Visby Rules
- Logistics
- Carriage of Goods by Sea Act 1971
- Carriage of Goods by Sea Act 1992
- Limitation of Liability Act of 1851
