= Thomas J. Schoenbaum =

American lawyer, legal scholar and author (1939–2026)

Thomas John Schoenbaum (August 15, 1939 – June 8, 2026) was an American lawyer, legal scholar and author. His work focused on maritime law, international trade law, and environmental law, and he championed the role of international law in the peaceful settlement of disputes. His career included 50 years in academia (1968–2018), service with multiple law firms, and the authorship of over 100 books and articles.

Schoenbaum was a life member of the American Law Institute.

== Education ==
Schoenbaum earned a Bachelor of Arts degree, summa cum laude, from St. Joseph's College in 1961. As a Fulbright Scholar, he received a master's degree in philosophy from the University of Louvain, Belgium, in 1962. In 1965, he earned his Juris Doctor degree with distinction from the University of Michigan Law School. He was a post-doctoral fellow at LMU Munich from 1965 to 1966 and completed a PhD in Law from Gonville and Caius College, Cambridge, in 2000.

== Academic and Public Service Career ==
Schoenbaum's academic career spanned five decades, during which he held numerous appointments in the United States and abroad.

=== University of North Carolina at Chapel Hill (1968–1979) ===
Schoenbaum began his career at UNC School of Law, where he played an instrumental role in establishing the field of environmental law. He introduced an Environmental Law course, drafted a successful environmental amendment to the State Constitution (1971), and chaired the drafting committee for the state's foundational Coastal Area Management Act of 1973.

=== Tulane, Georgia, and Later Appointments ===
At Tulane University Law School (1979–1983), Schoenbaum served as Associate Dean for Graduate Programs and solicited the foundation grant that established the Tulane Maritime Law Center.

From 1983 to 2002, he was the Dean and Virginia Rusk Professor of Law at the University of Georgia School of Law and Executive Director of the Dean Rusk Center. At the request of the Rusk family, he became the authorized biographer of former U.S. Secretary of State Dean Rusk. He organized the preservation of Rusk's private papers and conducted hundreds of hours of oral history interviews, which formed the basis of his 1988 biography, Waging Peace and War.

His later academic career included professorships at the International Christian University in Tokyo (2002–2010), the University of Milan (2010–2012), and the University of Washington School of Law (2013–2018). He currently holds appointments as Dean Rusk Professor of Law Emeritus at the University of Georgia and Research Professor at George Washington University Law School.

== Legal career ==
Schoenbaum was licensed to practice law in four states and was admitted to the Bar of the Supreme Court of the United States. He was an active member of the Maritime Law Association of the United States.

His career in private practice began at Jenner & Block (1966–1968). He later served as special counsel to several firms, including Jones, Walker, Waechter, Poitevent & Denegre. In his independent practice, he represented the State of Alaska after the Exxon Valdez oil spill and Japanese investors following the Deepwater Horizon oil spill. He also served as a contract lawyer for the United States Department of Justice on three occasions.

== Death ==
Schoenbaum died in Alexandria, Virginia, on June 8, 2026, at the age of 86.

== Major publications and recognition ==
Schoenbaum's written work has been influential in multiple fields of law.

=== Admiralty and Maritime Law ===
Schoenbaum was the author of the treatise Admiralty and Maritime Law, first published in 1987. The work, now in its seventh edition, is considered an authoritative text in its field. Its influence is demonstrated by its frequent citation by federal and state courts, including the Supreme Court of the United States.

=== Prize-Winning Scholarship ===
His book The World Trade Organization: Law, Process, and Policy, co-authored with Mitsuo Matsushita and Petros Mavroidis, received the American Society of International Law's 2003 Certificate of Merit for its "preeminent contribution to creative scholarship."

=== Other books ===
- Waging Peace and War: Dean Rusk in the Truman, Kennedy, and Johnson Years (1988)
- The Law and Legal System of the United States (3rd Edition)
- International Environmental Law (co-authored with Michael Young)
- Islands, Capes, and Sounds: The North Carolina Coast (1979)

== Fulbright Program ==
Schoenbaum's work has been supported by six Fulbright scholarships, which permitted him to live and work in several countries:

- Belgium (1961–62): As a student at the University of Louvain.
- Germany (1971–72): As a Fulbright Lecturer at the University of Cologne.
- Soviet Union (1975): As a Fulbright Research Scholar at the Institute of State and Law in Moscow.
- Belgium (1978): As a Fulbright Lecturer at the University of Liège.
- South Africa (1992): As a Fulbright Scholar at the University of the Western Cape. In this capacity, his role was to teach the courses of Professor Kader Asmal, a move which enabled Asmal to participate full-time in the negotiations to end apartheid. At Asmal's request, Schoenbaum also contributed to the drafting of a new South African constitution by submitting memoranda on federalism and human rights.
- Austria (2001): As a Fulbright Distinguished Professor of International Law at the University of Innsbruck.
