= Bill of lading =

Legal document issued by a carrier

A bill of lading (/ˈleɪdɪŋ/) (sometimes abbreviated as B/L or BOL) is a document issued by a carrier (or their agent) to acknowledge receipt of cargo for shipment. Although the term is historically related only to carriage by sea, a bill of lading may today be used for any type of carriage of goods.

Bills of lading are one of three crucial documents used in international trade to ensure that exporters receive payment and importers receive the merchandise. The other two documents are a policy of insurance and an invoice. (Note: In a CIF contract, the buyer is essentially buying three documents, all of which grant rights over the cargo.) Whereas a bill of lading is negotiable, both a policy and an invoice are assignable.

In international trade outside the United States, bills of lading are distinct from waybills in that the latter are not transferable and do not confer title. Nevertheless, the UK Carriage of Goods by Sea Act 1992 grants "all rights of suit under the contract of carriage" to the lawful holder of a bill of lading, or to the consignee under a sea waybill or a ship's delivery order.

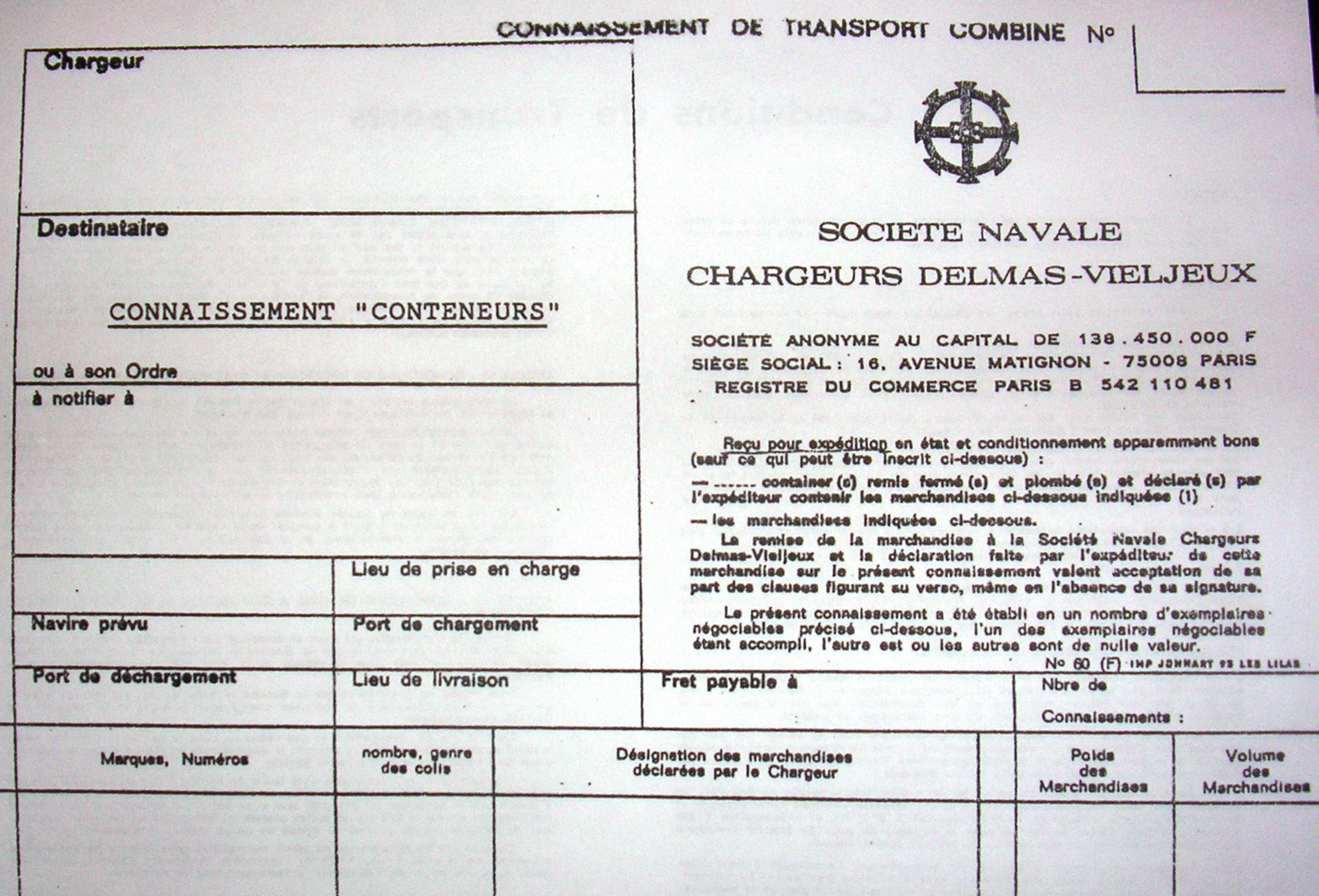
An example of a bill of lading

A bill of lading must be transferable, (Note: If a so-called "bill of lading" is NOT transferable, it will be merely a sea-waybill or a ship's delivery order) and serves three main functions:

- it is a conclusive receipt, i.e. an acknowledgement that the goods have been loaded; (Note: ... or received for shipment) and
- it contains, or evidences, (Note: "Evidences": the contract may already have been made informally by say, booking cargo space on board.) the terms of the contract of carriage; and
- it serves as a document of title to the goods, subject to the nemo dat rule.

Typical export transactions use Incoterms terms such as CIF, FOB or FAS, requiring the exporter/shipper to deliver the goods to the ship, whether onboard or alongside. Nevertheless, the loading itself will usually be done by the carrier or by a third party stevedore.

== Description ==
A bill of lading is a standard-form document which is transferable by endorsement (or by lawful transfer of possession). Most shipments by sea are covered by the Hague Rules, the Hague-Visby Rules or the Hamburg Rules, which require the carrier to issue the shipper a bill of lading identifying the nature, quantity, quality and leading marks (identification marks and numbers) of the goods.

In the United Kingdom, in the case of Coventry v Gladstone (1867), Lord Justice Blackburn defined a bill of lading as "A writing signed on behalf of the owner of ship in which goods are embarked, acknowledging the receipt of the Goods, and undertaking to deliver them at the end of the voyage, subject to such conditions as may be mentioned in the bill of lading." Therefore, it can be stated that the bill of lading was introduced to provide a receipt to the shipper in the absence of the owners.

In Glyn Mills & Co. v. East and West India Dock Co (1882), which concerned the presentation of a series of bills of lading, the decision also encompassed any document which "by mercantile law and usage ... is a symbol of the right of property in the goods".

Although the term "bill of lading" is well known and well understood, the proposed Rotterdam Rules use the term "transport documents", of which bills of lading and seaway bills are examples.

== History ==
While there is evidence of the existence of receipts for goods loaded aboard merchant vessels stretching back as far as Roman times, the practice of recording cargo aboard ship in the ship's log is almost as long-lived as shipping itself. The modern bill of lading only came into use with the growth of international trade in the medieval world.

The growth of mercantilism (which produced other financial innovations such as the charterparty or carta partita, the bill of exchange and the insurance policy) produced a requirement for a title document that could be traded in much the same way as the goods themselves. It was this new avenue of trade that produced the bill of lading in much the same format as currently used.

=== Etymology ===
The word "lading" means "loading", both words being derived from the Old English word hladan. "Lading" specifically refers to the loading of cargo aboard a ship. The Dutch word "lading" has exactly the same meaning (freight, cargo, an amount of transportable goods) as it has in the English "bill of lading", but is not restricted to shipping. Under English law, the Carriage of Goods by Sea Act 1992 provides that the term "bill of lading" includes a "received-for-shipment" bill of lading issued by, say, a freight forwarder or a storage depot/warehouse. A "combined bill of lading" may be issued by a carrier who, say, collects goods from a factory for subsequent delivery to a ship via multi-modal transport.

== Roles and purposes of bill of lading ==
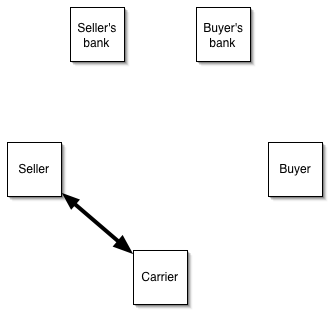
Step 1: Seller consigns the goods to a carrier in exchange for a bill of lading.

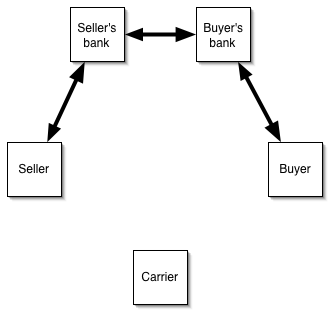
Step 2: Seller provides the bill of lading to bank in exchange for payment. Seller's bank then provides the bill to buyer's bank, who provides the bill to buyer.

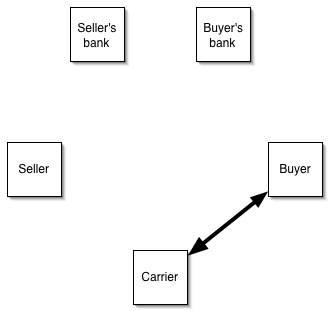
Step 3: Buyer provides the bill of lading to carrier and takes delivery of the goods.

=== As cargo receipt ===
The principal use of the bill of lading is as a receipt issued by the carrier once the goods have been loaded onto the vessel. This receipt can be used as proof of shipment for customs and insurance purposes, and also as commercial proof of completing a contractual obligation, especially under INCOTERMS such as CFR (Note: CFR - formerly known as C&F) (cost and freight) and FOB (free on board).

Although the Hague-Visby Rules provide that a bill of lading is only prima facie evidence of receipt, the Carriage of Goods by Sea Act 1992 s.4 declares a BoL "conclusive evidence of receipt". (Note: s.4 thereby overrules the decision in Grant v Norway 1851 10 CB 665)

- A "clean bill of lading" (aka "on-board bill of lading") is used when there is full compliance with no discrepancies between the description filed by the shipper and the actual goods shipped. A clean bill of lading indicates that the goods have been properly loaded onboard the carrier's ship in accordance with the contract.
- A "dirty bill of lading" (aka "claused bill of lading") will be issued if the goods to be shipped differ in quality or quantity from the contract description. The buyer's bank is entitled to reject a dirty bill of lading, but will often accept it after an agreed reduction in price. For examples, cargo could be leaking, or package could be damaged where the carrier has the right to issue a clause BL.
- "STC": if the cargo cannot be effectively examined, such as goods in a sealed container), the carrier will issue a bill of lading describing the goods as "container (identified by number) said to contain" the contracted cargo. The carrier or the agent mentions "STC" in BLs to safeguard themselves from shipper declaring wrong information on BL. Even this term is more favourable to the carrier in FCL shipping and there are instances where the carrier become at least partially liable in LCL shipping even after mentioning "STC" under cargo description. This is due to the carrier or agent do the stuffings of cargo for the shipper's LCL shipment. If the cargo within the container does not comply with the description, the consignee will take action against the seller, and the carrier will not be involved.

=== As evidence of the contract of carriage ===
The bill of lading from the carrier to the shipper can be used as evidence of the contract of carriage by the fact that the carrier has received the goods and upon the receipt, the carrier would deliver the goods. In this case, the bill of lading would be used as evidence of contract of carriage. In this case, the bill of lading can be used if the shipper does not properly ship the goods then the shipper cannot receive the bill of lading from the carrier. Eventually, the shipper would have to deliver the bill of lading to the seller. In this case, the bill of lading is used as evidence of contract of carriage between seller and carrier. However, when the bill of lading is negotiated to a bona fide third party then the bill of lading becomes conclusive evidence where no contradictory evidence can be introduced. It is because the third party cannot examine the actual shipment and can only pay attention to the document itself, not survey or examination of the shipment itself. However, the bill of lading will rarely be the contract itself, since the cargo space will have been booked previously, perhaps by telephone, email or letter. The preliminary contract will be acknowledged by both the shipper and carrier to incorporate the carrier's standard terms of business. If the Hague-Visby Rules apply, then all of the Rules will be automatically annexed to the bill of lading, thus forming a statutory contract.

The bill of lading is not a contract of carriage as it is only signed by the carrier. Yet, it acts as evidence of contract due to the activities taken place between the shipper and the consignee.

=== As title ===
When the bill of lading is used as a document of title, it is particularly related to the case of the buyer. When the buyer is entitled to receive goods from the carrier, the bill of lading in this case performs as a document of title for the goods. In simple words, the function of BL as a document of title shows who owns the cargo. Whoever has the duly endorsed BL is the rightful owner of the cargo described in the BL. Carrier becomes responsible before the law if they issue cargo to a party who is not the authorised person to claim the goods under this function. Further, if the BL is a "Seaway BL" document of title function will not be applicable. Simply, the bill of lading confers prima facie title over the goods to the named consignee or lawful holder. Under the "nemo dat quod non habet" rule ("no one gives what he doesn't have"), a seller cannot pass better title than he himself has; so if the goods are subject to an encumbrance (such as a mortgage, charge or hypothec), or even stolen, the bill of lading will not grant full title to the holder.

== Types of bills of lading ==
Bills of lading may take various forms, such as on-board and received-for-shipment.

- An on-board bill of lading denotes that merchandise has been physically loaded onto a shipping vessel, such as a freighter or cargo plane.
- A received-for-shipment bill of lading denotes that merchandise has been received, but is not guaranteed to have already been loaded onto a shipping vessel.(Typically, it will be issued by a freight-forwarder at a port or depot). Such bills can be converted upon being loaded. (Note: ... but there is no legal advantage to this exercise.) The received for shipment BLs are used to deliver documents to the consignee faster. Yet these BLs are not accepted if the payment method is LC (Letter of Credit).

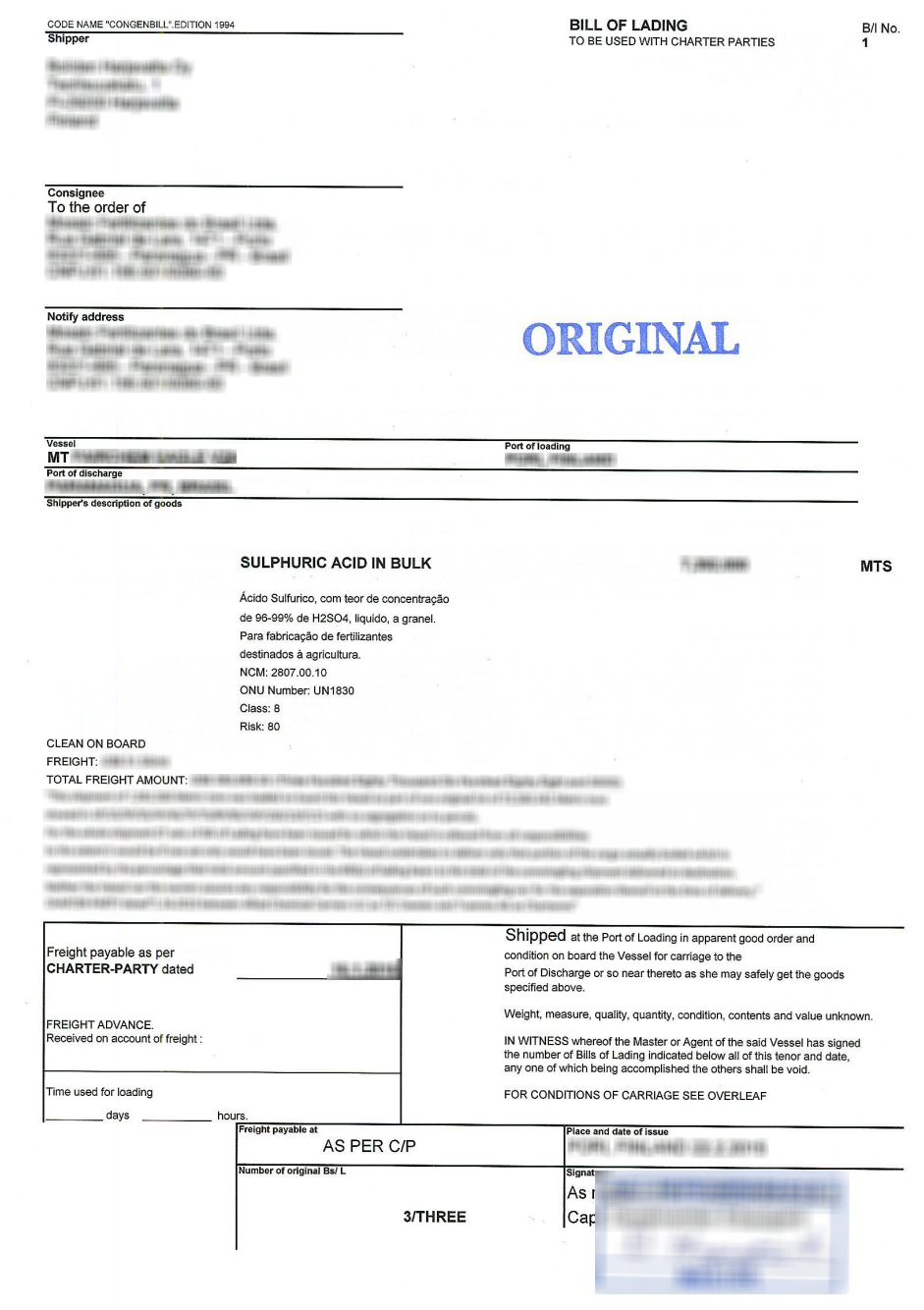
Charter-party bill of lading, for a sulfuric acid bulk cargo

- A straight bill of lading is used when payment has been made in advance of shipment and requires a carrier to deliver the merchandise to the appropriate party.
- An order bill of lading is used when shipping merchandise prior to payment, requiring a carrier to deliver the merchandise to the importer, and at the endorsement of the exporter the carrier may transfer title to the importer. Endorsed order bills of lading can be traded as a security or serve as collateral against debt obligations.

== Bills of lading and charterparties compared ==
A charterparty is the contract governing the relationship between the shipowner and the charterer. The bill of lading governs the relationship between the shipper and the carrier (who will be either a shipowner or a demise charterer). If the exporter (the shipper) is shipping a small amount of cargo, he will arrange for a carrier to carry the goods for him, using a bill of lading. If the exporter needs the whole (or a very substantial part) of the ship's cargo capacity, the exporter may need to charter the vessel, and he will enter into a charterparty agreement with the shipowner.

If the charter party is a time or voyage charterparty, the shipowner will still have control of the ship and its crew. If there is a demise (or "bareboat") charterparty, the charterer will effectively have a long lease and will have full control of the vessel. When the master (captain) issues a B/L to a shipper, he will be acting as an agent for the carrier, who will be either the shipowner (time or voyage) or the charterer (demise). In a time-charterparty or voyage-charterparty, if the charterer is shipping his own cargo (rather than the cargo of a third party) he will receive a bill of lading from the master, acting as agent of the shipowner; but that B/L will serve solely as a receipt and document of title, and its terms will (subject to contrary intent) be secondary to the terms of the charterparty, which remains the dominant contract.

== Sea waybills and electronic data interchange (EDI) ==
Under Art. III of the Hague-Visby Rules, a carrier must, on demand, provide the shipper with a bill of lading; but if the shipper agrees, a lesser document such as a "sea waybill" may be issued instead. In recent years, the use of bills of lading has declined, and they have tended to be replaced with the sea waybill. (If a so-called bill of lading is declared to be "non-negotiable", then it is not a true B/L, and instead will be treated as a sea waybill.)

The main difference between these two documents is that the waybill gives the bearer the right to possession of the cargo, but does not confer title in the goods. As a result, there is no need for the physical document to be presented for the goods to be released. The carrier will automatically release the goods to the consignee once the import formalities have been completed. This results in a much smoother flow of trade, and has allowed shipping lines to move towards electronic data interchange which may greatly ease the flow of global trade. For some time, it has been the case that the cargo may arrive at the destination before the bill of lading; and a practice has arisen for the shipper (having sent the bill of lading to the banks for checking) to send to the consignee a letter of indemnity (LOI) which can be presented to the carrier in exchange for the cargo. The LOI indemnifies the carrier against any cargo claim, but the document is not transferable and has no established legal status. For letter of credit and documentary collection transactions, it is important to retain title to the goods until the transaction is complete. This means that the bill of lading still remains a vital document within international trade. Alternatively, to overcome the possibility of the goods reaching the destination ahead of the cargo, majority of the Shipping Lines offer an "Express release" service (formerly known as "Telex release"). By surrendering the full set of bills of lading issues at the port of loading, the shipping line can instruct the port of discharge to release the cargo without the physical presentation of bills of lading at destination.

=== Electronic bills of lading ===
For many years, the industry has sought a solution to the difficulties, costs and inefficiencies associated with paper bills of lading. One answer is to make the bill an electronic document. An electronic bill of lading (or eB/L) is the legal and functional equivalent of a paper bill of lading. An electronic bill of lading must replicate the core functions of a paper bill of lading, namely its functions as a receipt, as evidence of or containing the contract of carriage and as a document of title.

The UNCITRAL Model Law on Electronic Transferable Records enables the issuance of bills of lading in electronic form that are functionally equivalent to paper-based ones. As a result, electronic bills of lading may be issued in the jurisdictions that have enacted that Model Law. These are Singapore and Bahrain. Besides that, German law allows the usage of electronic Bills of Lading and other documents of title, see sec. 516 of the German Commercial Code. The German principle of functional equivalence matches with the MLETR. In the United Kingdom the Electronic Trade Documents Act, enacted in July 2023; made the usage of electronic Bills of lading legal.

In February 2023 the nine member carriers of the Digital Container Shipping Association (DCSA) — MSC, Maersk, CMA CGM, Hapag-Lloyd, ONE, Evergreen, Yang Ming, HMM and ZIM — committed to issuing 50 per cent of their original bills of lading electronically within five years and 100 per cent by 2030, using standards published by the association.

== See also ==
- Law of Carriage of Goods by Sea
- Trade finance
- Waybill
