= Port centric logistics =

Port Centric Logistics as a concept in supply chain management has developed since around the turn of the millennium.

Multimodal transport driven container logistics operations typically utilise ocean-going vessels for long-distance movements, with inland movements undertaken by barge, rail or truck. Conventionally the container is unloaded from the ship at the port and transported to an inland destination by intermodal freight transport. In the port centric approach, the container is unloaded (or "unstuffed") at the port and its contents are then transported inland e.g. as palletised freight.

== Logistics Optimization ==
The port centric approach is not appropriate for all supply chains, but due to the complexities of modern logistics networks it can be difficult to quantify the benefits for each case. Operationally, port centric logistics offers significant benefits but also presents a number of planning and management issues which need to be overcome.

For example, increased storage of goods, and corresponding handling activity could lead to increased congestion around the port. On the other hand, the greater flexibility for distributing the goods in (e.g.) palletised form can lead to savings in the relatively costly inland transport section of the supply chain.
