= Lickbarrow v Mason =

English legal case

Lickbarrow v Mason ((1788), 2 T. R. 63 and (1794) 5 TR 683) refers to an English legal case in which it was determined that a shipped or endorsed bill of lading is a document of title at common law, i.e. a document which can be owned and therefore the ownership of it could be sold or otherwise transferred to someone else. The legal nature of a bill of lading as a document of title is said to originate from this case, in which bills of lading were endorsed in favour of the plaintiffs, Lickbarrow, against a payment to be made to the seller's agent.
