= Marc Rich & Co AG v Bishop Rock Marine Co Ltd =

English tort law case

The Nicholas H
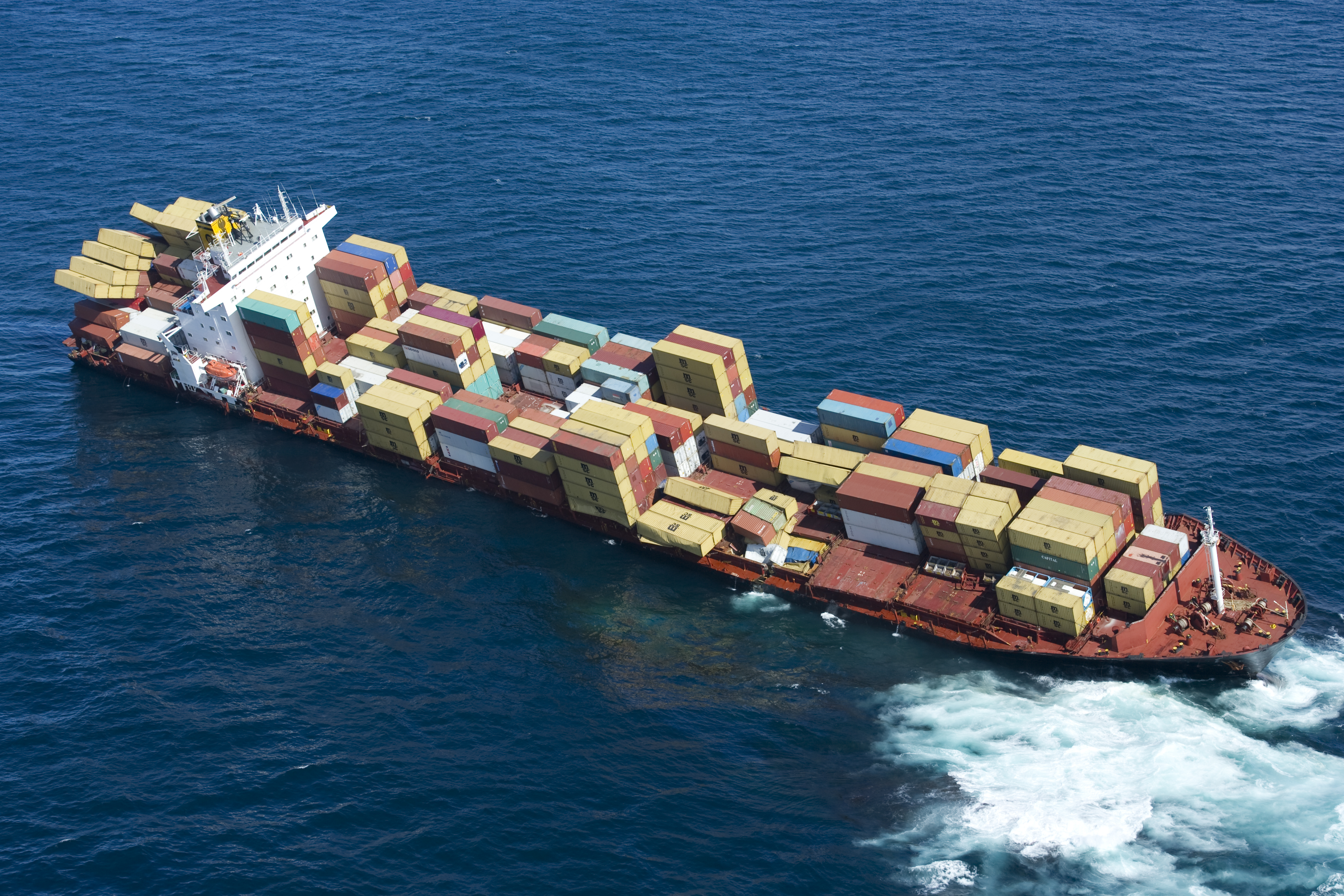
- Court: House of Lords
- Full case name: Marc Rich & Co AG v Bishop Rock Marine Co Ltd
- Citations: [1995] UKHL 4, [1996] AC 211

Court membership
- Judge sitting: Lord Steyn

The Nicholas H [1995] UKHL 4 is an English tort law case, concerning the duty of care in negligence and international law.

== Facts ==
The defendant shipping classification society certified a ship, The Nicholas H, as seaworthy after repairs to a crack that had developed. The ship was carrying lead and zinc concentrates, owned by Marc Rich & Co AG. The certifier was employed by Nippon Kaiji Kyokai, and Bishop Rock Marine Co Ltd was the ship's insurer. When the ship left port, bound from Puerto Rico to Italy, it sank, and Marc Rich's cargo was lost.

== Judgment ==
The House of Lords held the defendant owed no duty of care. The Hague Rules of 1924, an international convention, limited liability of carriers to cargo owners in respect of loss of cargo.

Lord Lloyd gave a dissenting opinion, as he did not see why imposing a duty of care would "upset" the Hague Rules.

== See also ==
- English tort law
