= Maritime Law Association of the United States =

Non-governmental organization

- Abbreviation: MLAUS
- Formation: 1899
- President: James F. Moseley, Jr.
- Website: https://mlaus.org/

The Maritime Law Association of the United States (MLAUS) is an American maritime law organization. It is the United States representative in the Comité Maritime International.

== Activities ==
The association was formed in 1899 with the goal of having the United States become part of a globally unified maritime law system. While they do not lobby, they have written resolutions endorsing certain political (such as a congressional overturn of Wilburn Boat) and judicial decisions.

They have been strong supporters of US ratification of UNCLOS and the Rotterdam Rules.

The MLAUS has multiple committees for specialties within maritime law. It also has a proctor credential program for experienced maritime attorneys.
