= Loss and damage (disambiguation) =

Loss and damage may refer to:

- Loss and damage (law), legal term for financial harm
  - Loss and damage claim, specifically for transported goods
- Loss and damage (climate change), concept to address adverse effects of climate change

== See also ==
- Capital loss, in finance
- Pure economic loss, legal concept
