= Maritime law =

Law of the oceans and their use

Maritime law or admiralty law is a body of law that governs legal matters arising from activities conducted on navigable waters, including commercial shipping contracts, personal injury and property disputes (torts), and the rights and responsibilities owed among vessel owners, cargo interests, insurers, and crew members. Admiralty law consists of both domestic law on maritime activities, and private international law governing the relationships between private parties operating or using ocean-going ships. While each legal jurisdiction usually has its own legislation governing maritime matters, the international nature of the topic and the need for uniformity has, since 1900, led to considerable international maritime law developments, including numerous multilateral treaties. (Note: Such as the COLREGS, SOLAS, Hague-Visby Rules, ISPS, etc.)

Admiralty law, which mainly governs the relations of private parties, is distinguished from the law of the sea, a body of public international law regulating maritime relationships between nations, such as navigational rights, mineral rights, and jurisdiction over coastal waters. While admiralty law is adjudicated in national courts, the United Nations Convention on the Law of the Sea has been adopted by 167 countries (Note: The Convention on the Law of the Sea has not been ratified by 29 United Nations member and observer states, most notably the United States. See United States non-ratification of the UNCLOS.) and the European Union, and disputes are resolved at the ITLOS tribunal in Hamburg.

== History ==
Shipping was one of the earliest channels of commerce, and rules for resolving maritime trade disputes were developed early. An ancient example was the Rhodian law (Nomos Rhodion Nautikos), of which no extensive written specimen has survived, but which is alluded to in other legal texts (Roman and Byzantine legal codes). In southern Italy the Ordinamenta et consuetudo maris (1063) at Trani and the Amalfian Laws were in effect from an early date, and later the customs of the Consulate of the Sea and the Hanseatic League.

Bracton notes that admiralty law was also used as an alternative to the common law in Norman England, which previously required voluntary submission to it by entering a plea seeking judgment from the court.

A leading sponsor of admiralty law in Europe was the French Queen Eleanor of Aquitaine. Eleanor had learned about admiralty law while on the Second Crusade in the eastern Mediterranean with her first husband, King Louis VII of France. Eleanor then established admiralty law on the island of Oléron, where it was published as the Rolls of Oléron. Some time later, while she was in London as regent for her son, King Richard I of England, Eleanor instituted admiralty law in England as well.

In England and Wales, a special Admiralty Court handles all admiralty cases. Despite early reliance upon civil law concepts derived from the Corpus Juris Civilis of Justinian, the English Admiralty Court is a common law court, albeit sui generis, that was initially somewhat distinct from other English courts. After around 1750, as the Industrial Revolution took hold and English maritime commerce burgeoned, the Admiralty Court became a fertile source of legal innovation to meet the new situations of the modern economy. The Judicature Acts of 1873–1875 abolished the Admiralty Court as such, and it became conflated in the new Probate, Divorce and Admiralty division of the High Court. However, when the PDA was abolished and replaced by a new Family Division, admiralty jurisdiction passed to a so-called Admiralty Court which was effectively the King's Bench sitting to hear nautical cases. The Senior Courts Act 1981 then clarified the admiralty jurisdiction of the Queen's Bench, so England and Wales once again has a distinct Admiralty Court (albeit no longer based in the Royal Courts of Justice, but in the Rolls Building).

English Admiralty courts were prominent in the disputes leading to the American Revolution. For example, the phrase in the Declaration of Independence "For depriving us in many cases, of the benefits of Trial by Jury" refers to the practice of the UK Parliament giving the Admiralty Courts jurisdiction to enforce the Stamp Act 1765 in the American colonies. The Stamp Act was unpopular in America, so a colonial jury would be unlikely to convict a colonist of its violation. The Admiralty Court, which has never allowed trial by jury, was thus empowered to enforce the statute more effectively.

Admiralty law gradually became part of United States law through admiralty cases arising after the adoption of the U.S. Constitution in 1789. Many American lawyers prominent in the American Revolution were admiralty and maritime lawyers, including Alexander Hamilton in New York and John Adams in Massachusetts.

In 1787, Thomas Jefferson wrote to James Madison proposing that the US Constitution, then under consideration by the States, be amended to include "trial by jury in all matters of fact triable by the laws of the land and not by the laws of Nations". The result was the United States Bill of Rights. Alexander Hamilton and John Adams were both admiralty lawyers and Adams represented John Hancock in an admiralty case in colonial Boston involving seizure of one of Hancock's ships for violations of customs regulations. In the more modern era, Supreme Court Justice Oliver Wendell Holmes was an admiralty lawyer before ascending to the bench.

== Features ==
Matters dealt by admiralty law include marine commerce, marine navigation, salvage, maritime pollution, seafarers' rights, and the carriage by sea of both passengers and goods. Admiralty law also covers land-based commercial activities that are maritime in character, such as marine insurance. Some lawyers prefer to reserve the term "admiralty law" for "wet law" (e.g. salvage, collisions, ship arrest, towage, liens and limitation), and use "maritime law" only for "dry law" (e.g. carriage of goods and people, marine insurance, and the Maritime Labour Convention). (Note: The title of Aleka Mandaraka-Sheppard's book changed from Mandaraka-Sheppard, Aleka (2007). Modern Admiralty Law (2nd ed.). Cavendish. ISBN 9781843141969. to Mandaraka-Sheppard, Aleka (2014). Modern Maritime Law (3rd ed.). Routledge. ISBN 9780415843201.)

=== Maintenance and cure ===
The doctrine of maintenance and cure is rooted in Article VI of the Rolls of Oléron promulgated in about 1160 AD. The obligation to "cure" requires a shipowner to provide medical care free of charge to a seaman injured in the service of the ship, until the seaman has reached "maximum medical cure". The concept of "maximum medical cure" is more extensive than the concept "maximum medical improvement". The obligation to "cure" a seaman includes the obligation to provide him with medications and medical devices which improve his ability to function, even if they do not "improve" his actual condition. They may include long-term treatments that permit him to continue to function well. Common examples include prostheses, wheelchairs, and pain medications.

The obligation of "maintenance" requires the shipowner to provide a seaman with his basic living expenses while he is convalescing. Once a seaman is able to work, he is expected to maintain himself. Consequently, a seaman can lose his right to maintenance, while the obligation to provide cure is ongoing.

A seaman who is required to sue a shipowner to recover maintenance and cure may also recover his attorneys fees. Vaughan v. Atkinson, 369 U.S. 527 (1962). If a shipowner's breach of the obligation to provide maintenance and cure is willful and wanton, the shipowner may be subject to punitive damages. See Atlantic Sounding Co. v. Townsend, 557 U.S. 404 (2009) (J. Thomas).

=== Personal injuries to passengers ===
Shipowners owe a duty of reasonable care to passengers. Consequently, passengers who are injured aboard ships may bring suit as if they had been injured ashore through the negligence of a third party. The passenger bears the burden of proving that the shipowner was negligent. While personal injury cases must generally be pursued within three years, suits against cruise lines may need to be brought within one year because of limitations contained in the passenger ticket. Notice requirements in the ticket may require a formal notice to be brought within six months of the injury. Most US cruise line passenger tickets also have provisions requiring that suit to be brought in either Miami or Seattle.

In England, the 1954 case of Adler v Dickson (The Himalaya) [1954] allowed a shipping line to escape liability when a bosun's negligence resulted in a passenger being injured. Since then, the Unfair Contract Terms Act 1977 has made it unlawful to exclude liability for death or personal injury caused by one's negligence. (Since then, however, the so-called "Himalaya clause" has become a useful way for a contractor to pass on the protection of a limitation clause to his employees, agents and third-party contractors.)

=== Maritime liens and mortgages ===
Banks which loan money to purchase ships, vendors who supply ships with necessaries like fuel and stores, seamen who are due wages, and many others have a lien against the ship to guarantee payment. To enforce the lien, the ship must be arrested or seized. In the United States, an action to enforce a lien against a US ship must be brought in federal court and cannot be done in state court, except for under the reverse Erie Doctrine whereby state courts can apply federal law.

=== Salvage and treasure salvage ===
When property is lost at sea and rescued by another, the rescuer (salvor) is entitled to claim a salvage award on the salvaged property. This applies only to the saving of property: there is no "life salvage", as all mariners have a duty to save the lives of others in peril without expectation of reward.

There are two types of salvage: contract salvage and pure salvage (merit salvage). In contract salvage, the owner of the property and the salvor enter into a salvage contract prior to salvage operations, for an agreed payment. The most common form is a "Lloyd's Open Form Salvage Contract".

In pure salvage, there is no contract between the owner of the goods and the salvor, and the relationship is imputed by law. The salvor must bring his claim for salvage in court, which awards salvage based upon the merit of the service and the value of the salvaged property.

Pure salvage claims are divided into "high-order" and "low-order" salvage. In high-order salvage, the salvor and his crew risk of injury and damage to equipment during salvage operations: for example boarding a sinking ship in heavy weather, boarding a ship on fire, raising a ship which has already sunk, or towing a ship away from the surf near shore. In low-order salvage, the salvor takes little or no personal risk, for example towing a vessel in calm seas, supplying fuel, or pulling a vessel off a sand bar. High-order salvage earns a substantially greater salvage award.

In both high-order and low-order salvage, the amount of the salvage award is based first upon the value of the property saved. If nothing is saved, or if additional damage is done, there will be no award. The other factors to be considered are the skills of the salvor, the peril to which the salvaged property was exposed, the value of the property which was risked in effecting the salvage, the amount of time and money expended, etc.

A pure or merit salvage award will seldom exceed 50 percent of the value of the property saved. The exception is in the case of treasure salvage. Because sunken treasure has generally been lost for hundreds of years, while the original owner (or insurer, if the vessel was insured) continues to have an interest in it, the salvor or finder will generally get the majority of the value of the property. While sunken ships from the Spanish Main (such as Nuestra Señora de Atocha in the Florida Keys) are the most famous type of treasure salvage, other types – including German submarines from World War II which can hold valuable historical artifacts, American Civil War ships (the USS Maple Leaf in the St. Johns River, and the CSS Virginia in Chesapeake Bay), and sunken merchant ships (the SS Central America off Cape Hatteras) – have all been the subject of treasure salvage awards. Due to refinements in side-scanning sonars, many more ships are now being located and treasure salvage is less risky, although it is still highly speculative and expensive.

=== Allision ===
In maritime law, it is occasionally desirable to distinguish between the situation of a vessel striking a moving object and that of it striking a stationary object. The word "allision" is then used to mean the striking of a stationary object, while "collision" is used to mean the striking of a moving object. Thus, when two vessels run against each other, courts typically use the term collision whereas when one vessel runs against a stationary object, they typically use the term allision. The fixed or stationary object could be a bridge or dock.

While there is no great difference between the two terms and often they are even used interchangeably, determining the difference helps clarify the circumstances of emergencies and adapt accordingly.

== International conventions ==
Before the mid-1970s, most international conventions concerning maritime trade and commerce originated in a private organization of maritime lawyers known as the Comité Maritime International (International Maritime Committee or CMI). Founded in 1897, the CMI drafted numerous international conventions, including the Hague Rules (International Convention on Bills of Lading), the Visby Amendments (amending the Hague Rules), the Salvage Convention, and many others. While the CMI continues to function in an advisory capacity, many of its functions have been taken over by the International Maritime Organization (IMO). In 1948 an international conference in Geneva adopted a convention formally establishing IMO (the original name was the Inter-Governmental Maritime Consultative Organization, or IMCO, but the name was changed in 1982 to IMO with UN Convention on the Law of the Sea). The IMO Convention entered into force in 1958 and the new Organization met for the first time the following year. The IMO has prepared numerous international conventions concerning maritime safety, including the International Convention for the Safety of Life at Sea (SOLAS), the Standards for Training, Certification, and Watchkeeping (STCW), the International Regulations for Preventing Collisions at Sea (Collision Regulations or COLREGS), Maritime Pollution Regulations (MARPOL), International Convention on Maritime Search and Rescue (SAR Convention) and others. The United Nations Convention on the Law of the Sea (UNCLOS) defined a treaty regarding protection of the marine environment and various maritime boundaries. Restrictions on international fishing such as International Convention for the Regulation of Whaling also form part of the body of conventions in international waters. Other commercial conventions include the "International Convention relating to the Limitation of the Liability of Owners of Sea-Going Ships", Brussels, 10 October 1957. and International Convention for Safe Containers.

Once adopted, most international conventions are enforced by the individual signatory nations, either through their Port State Control, or through their national courts. Cases within the ambit of the European Union's EMSA may be heard by the CJEU in Luxembourg. By contrast, disputes involving the Law of the Sea may be resolved at ITLOS in Hamburg, provided that the parties are signatories to UNCLOS.

== Piracy ==
Throughout history, piracy has been defined as hostis humani generis, or the enemy of all mankind. While the flag state normally has jurisdiction over a ship on the high seas, there is universal jurisdiction in the case of piracy, which means that any nation may pursue pirates on the high seas, including pursuing them into a country's territorial waters. Most nations have signed onto the 1982 United Nations Convention on the Law of the Sea which dictates the legal requirements for pursuing pirates.

Merchant vessels transiting areas of increased pirate activity (i.e. the Gulf of Aden, Somali Basin, Southern Red Sea and Bab-el-Mandeb straits) are advised to implement self-protective measures, in accordance with most recent best management practices agreed upon by the members of the merchant industry and endorsed by the NATO Shipping Centre, and the Maritime Security Centre Horn-of-Africa (MSCHOA).

== Individual countries ==
=== Britain and certain other Commonwealth countries ===
The common law of England and Wales, of Northern Ireland law, and of US law, contrast to the continental law (civil law) that prevails in Scottish law and in continental Europe, which trace back to Roman law. Although the English Admiralty court was a development of continental civil law, the Admiralty Court of England and Wales was a common law court, albeit somewhat distanced from the mainstream King's Bench.

Most of the common law countries (including Pakistan, Singapore, India, and many other Commonwealth of Nations countries) follow English statute and case law. India still follows many Victorian-era British statutes such as the Admiralty Court Act 1861 [24 Vict c 10]. While Pakistan now has its own statute, the Admiralty Jurisdiction of High Courts Ordinance, 1980 (Ordinance XLII of 1980), it also follows English case law. One reason for this is that the 1980 Ordinance is partly modelled on old English admiralty law, namely the Administration of Justice Act 1956. The current statute dealing with the Admiralty jurisdiction of the England and Wales High Court is the Senior Courts Act 1981, ss. 20–24, 37. The provisions in those sections are, in turn, based on the International Arrest Convention 1952. Other countries which do not follow the English statute and case laws, such as Panama, also have established well-known maritime courts which decide international cases on a regular basis.

Admiralty courts assume jurisdiction by virtue of the presence of the vessel in its territorial jurisdiction irrespective of whether the vessel is national or not and whether registered or not, and wherever the residence or domicile or their owners may be. A vessel is usually arrested by the court to retain jurisdiction. State-owned vessels are usually immune from arrest.

=== Canada ===
Canadian jurisdiction in the area of navigation and shipping is vested in the Parliament of Canada by virtue of s. 91(10) of the Constitution Act, 1867.

Canada has adopted an expansive definition of its maritime law, which goes beyond traditional admiralty law. The original English admiralty jurisdiction was called "wet", as it concerned itself with things done at sea, including collisions, salvage and the work of mariners, and contracts and torts performed at sea. Canadian law has added "dry" jurisdiction to this field, which includes such matters as:

- stevedoring,
- marine insurance,
- warehousing and security services,
- contracts of agency, and
- contracts of carriage.

This list is not exhaustive of the subject matter.

Canadian jurisdiction was originally consolidated in 1891, with subsequent expansions in 1934 following the passage of the Statute of Westminster 1931, and in 1971 with the extension to "dry" matters.

Recent jurisprudence at the Supreme Court of Canada has tended to expand the maritime law power, thus overriding prior provincial laws based on the provinces' power over property and civil rights.

=== United States ===
==== Jurisdiction ====
Article III, Section 2 of the United States Constitution grants original jurisdiction to U.S. federal courts over admiralty and maritime matters; however, that jurisdiction is not exclusive, and most maritime cases can be heard in either state or federal courts under the "saving to suitors" clause.

There are five types of cases which can only be brought in federal court:

- limitation of shipowner's liability,
- vessel arrests in rem,
- property arrests quasi in rem,
- salvage cases, and
- petitory and possession actions.

The common element of those cases are that they require the court to exercise jurisdiction over maritime property. For example, in a petitory and possession action, a vessel whose title is in dispute, usually between co-owners, will be put in the possession of the court until the title dispute can be resolved. In a limitation action, the shipowner will post a bond reflecting the value of the vessel and her pending freight. A sixth category, that of prize, relating to claims over vessels captured during wartime, has been rendered obsolete due to changes in the laws and practices of warfare.

Aside from those five types of cases, all other maritime cases, such as claims for personal injuries, cargo damage, collisions, maritime products liability, and recreational boating accidents may be brought in either federal or state court.

From a tactical standpoint it is important to consider that in federal courts in the United States, there is generally no right to trial by jury in admiralty cases, although the 1920 Jones Act grants a jury trial to seamen suing their employers.

Maritime law is governed by a uniform three-year statute of limitations for personal injury and wrongful death cases. Cargo cases must be brought within two years (extended from the one-year allowance under the Hague-Visby Rules), pursuant to the adoption of the Rotterdam Rules. Most major cruise ship passenger tickets have a one-year statute of limitations.

==== Applicable law ====
A state court hearing an admiralty or maritime case is required to apply the admiralty and maritime law, even if it conflicts with the law of the state, under a doctrine known as the "reverse-Erie doctrine". While the "Erie doctrine" requires that federal courts hearing state actions must apply substantive state law, the "reverse-Erie doctrine" requires state courts hearing admiralty cases to apply substantive federal admiralty law. However, state courts are allowed to apply state procedural law. This change can be significant.

==== Features of U.S. admiralty law ====
===== Cargo claims =====
Claims for damage to cargo shipped in international commerce are governed by the Carriage of Goods by Sea Act (COGSA), which is the U.S. enactment of the Hague Rules. One of its key features is that a shipowner is liable for cargo damaged from "hook to hook", meaning from loading to discharge, unless it is exonerated under one of 17 exceptions to liability, such as an "act of God", the inherent nature of the goods, errors in navigation, and management of the ship. The basis of liability for the shipowner is a bailment and if the carrier is to be liable as a common carrier, it must be established that the goods were placed in the carrier's possession and control for immediate carriage.

===== Personal injuries to seamen =====
Seamen injured aboard ship have three possible sources of compensation: the principle of maintenance and cure, the doctrine of unseaworthiness, and the Jones Act. The principle of maintenance and cure requires a shipowner to both pay for an injured seaman's medical treatment until maximum medical recovery (MMR) is obtained and provide basic living expenses until completion of the voyage, even if the seaman is no longer aboard ship.

=== Pakistan ===
Admiralty law in Pakistan is also classified as shipping law. The Pakistan Merchant Shipping Ordinance 2001 has replaced the Merchant Shipping Act 1923. This replacement was done in 2001 to handle the constantly upgrading modern shipping industry. The purpose of the Pakistan Merchant Shipping Ordinance 2001 is to provide a strategy and rules under which the government authorities will function in dealing with stuff related to the shipping industry. This law also handles duties internationally required under the ILO (International Labour Organization) conventions as Pakistan is an active member of the ILO.

== Academic programs ==
There are several universities that offer maritime law programs. What follows is a partial list of universities offering postgraduate maritime courses:

- Pakistan
  - Bahria University Law School – LLM in International and Maritime Laws
- Canada
  - Dalhousie Law School – LLM in marine and environmental law
- France
  - Panthéon-Assas University – LLM in international, business or private law with marine law courses
  - University of Nice Sophia Antipolis – LLM in marine and environmental law
  - University of Western Brittany in Brest – LLM in marine law
  - University of Nantes in Nantes – Master of Laws and Safety of maritime and oceanic activities
  - University of Le Havre in Le Havre – Master of Laws in Maritime & Ports Activities Law
- Belgium
  - Ghent University- Master of Science in Maritime Science
- Germany
  - University of Hamburg with Max Planck Institute for Comparative and International Private Law – PhD in maritime law
- Malaysia
  - Universiti Teknologi Mara – LLM in Legal Aspects of Marine Affairs
  - Netherlands Maritime University College - Diploma in Maritime law
- Malta
  - International Maritime Law Institute – LLM in International Maritime Law
- Netherlands
  - Erasmus University Rotterdam – LLM in Business, Corporate, and Maritime Law; Master of Science (MSc) In Maritime Economics and Logistics (MEL)
- Norway
  - University of Oslo (Scandinavian Institute of Maritime Law) – LLM in maritime law
  - University of Oslo – Master of Laws in Maritime Law
- Romania
  - Ovidius University of Constanța – Master of Laws in Maritime Law
- Singapore
  - National University of Singapore – LLM in maritime law (Graduate Diploma in Maritime Law and Arbitration International Maritime Organization)
- South Africa
  - University of Cape Town – Masters in Maritime Law
- Spain
  - Comillas Pontifical University – Master in Maritime Business and Maritime Law (ICADE – Spanish Maritime Institute)
  - University of Deusto – Master in Maritime Enterprise Management and Maritime Law
- Sweden
  - Lund University – LLM in maritime law
  - World Maritime University Master of Science in Maritime Affairs (Maritime Law and Policy)
- Thailand
  - Thammasat University – LLM in international trade law
- United Kingdom
  - Bangor University – LLM in Maritime Law and LLM in Law of the Sea
  - Cardiff University – LLM in Shipping Law
  - City University London – LLM in Maritime Law
  - Liverpool John Moores University – BSc & MSc in Maritime, Transport & Logistics (MTL) (with embedded maritime law elements)
  - Queen Mary, University of London – LLM in International Shipping Law
  - Swansea University (Institute of International Shipping and Trade Law) – LLM in International Maritime Law
  - University College London – LLM in Maritime Law
  - University of Hertfordshire – LLM in Maritime Law
  - University of Nottingham – LLM in Maritime Law
  - University of Southampton School of Law (Institute of Maritime Law) – LLB (Maritime Law) and LLM in Maritime Law
- United States
  - Charleston School of Law – LLM in Admiralty and Maritime Law
  - Florida Coastal School of Law – LLM in Logistics and Transportation Law
  - St. Thomas University School of Law
  - Tulane University Law School – LLM in admiralty and JD with a Certificate of Specialization in Admiralty & Maritime Law
  - University of Miami School of Law – LLM in Ocean and Coastal Law
  - William S. Richardson School of Law University of Hawaii – LLM in Ocean Law and Policy

== Conspiracy theory ==
A pseudolegal conspiracy theory of American origin, notably present among the anti-government sovereign citizen and freeman on the land movements, asserts that at some point maritime law, which they consider to be the law of international commerce, substituted for the original, legitimate "common law" system as part of a broader conspiracy which secretly replaced governments with corporations. The judiciary hence became admiralty courts with no jurisdiction over people. Sovereign citizens notably claim that the presence of gold fringes on the American flags displayed in courtrooms is evidence of maritime law being in effect.

One variation of this theory is based on a misinterpretation of the English Cestui Que Vie Act 1666 which stated that a person missing at sea shall be assumed to be dead after seven years; conspiracy theorists claim that the government uses this Act to secretly enslave people, by assuming any person to be legally dead from the age of seven and thereafter considering their person and/or property as its possessions.

The origin of the maritime law conspiracy theory is unknown, though it may stem from a misunderstanding of some nautical-sounding words in common usage in the English-language judiciary such as ownership, citizenship, dock or birth (berth) certificate. This theory is entirely devoid of merit: when invoked by litigants, it has been consistently dismissed as frivolous.

== See also ==
- Admiralty
- Barratry (admiralty law)
- Declaration of London
- General average
- Maritime environmental crime
- Prize (law)
