= Supply chain engineering =

Engineering discipline that concerns the planning, design, and operation of supply chains

Supply chain engineering is the engineering discipline that concerns the planning, design, and operation of supply chains. Some of its main areas include logistics, production, and pricing. It involves various areas in mathematical modelling such as operations research, machine learning, and optimization, which are usually implemented using software.

== Comparison with other disciplines ==
Supply chain engineering draws heavily from, and overlaps with other engineering disciplines such as industrial engineering, manufacturing engineering, systems engineering, information engineering, and software engineering. Although supply chain engineering and supply chain management have the same goals, the former is focused on a mathematical model-based approach, whereas the latter is focused on a more traditional management and business-based one. Supply chain engineering can be seen as including supply chain optimization, although this can also be undertaken using more qualitative management-based approaches which are less of a focus in supply chain engineering.

== Applications ==
Supply chain engineering is applied to all parts of supply chains, including:

- Authentication and tracking, such as via RFID technology
- Financing
- Demand forecasting
- Facility location
- Logistics for both goods and people
  - Transportation
  - Warehousing and inventory management
- Pricing
- Production and manufacturing

== Techniques ==
Supply chain engineering uses a wide variety of mathematical techniques such as:

- Control theory, and particularly optimal control
- Optimization
- Forecasting
  - Time series analysis
- Machine learning and artificial intelligence
- Operations research
  - Flow network analysis
  - Inventory management
  - Routing

== See also ==
- Supply chain finance
