= Hamburg Rules =

1978 admiralty law convention

United Nations Convention on the Carriage of Goods by Sea
- Signed: 31 March 1978
- Location: Hamburg and New York
- Effective: 1 November 1992
- Condition: Ratification by 20 states
- Signatories: 28
- Ratifiers: 36
- Depositary: UN Secretary-General
- Languages: Arabic, Chinese, English, French, Russian and Spanish

The Hamburg Rules are a set of rules governing the international shipment of goods, resulting from the United Nations International Convention on the Carriage of Goods by Sea adopted in Hamburg on 31 March 1978. (Note: The Rules are dated 30 March 1978 but the "post provisions" appended to the rules state that they were "Done at Hamburg, this thirty-first day of March one thousand nine hundred and seventy-eight".) The convention was an attempt to form a uniform legal base for the transportation of goods on oceangoing ships. A driving force behind the convention was the attempt by developing countries' to provide all participants a fair and equal chance of succeeding. It came into force on 1 November 1992.

== History ==
The first of the international conventions on the carriage of goods by sea was the Hague Rules of 1924. In 1968, the Hague Rules were updated to become the Hague-Visby Rules, but the changes were modest. The convention still covered only "tackle to tackle" carriage contracts, with no provision for multimodal transport. The industry-changing phenomenon of containerization was barely acknowledged. The 1978 Hamburg Rules were introduced to provide a framework that was both more modern, and less biased in favour of ship-operators. Although the Hamburg Rules were readily adopted by developing countries, they were shunned by richer countries who stuck with Hague and Hague-Visby. It had been expected that a Hague/Hamburg compromise might arise, but instead the more extensive Rotterdam Rules appeared.

== Contents ==
The Rules apply when goods are being shipped to or from a port in a Contracting State, or when carriage-related documentation has been issued within a Contracting State, and their application covers the time goods are situated in port before shipping and in port after discharge from the ship, as well as the period of actual carriage. The duties ascribed to a "carrier", an "actual carrier", a "shipper" and a "consignee" are defined by the rules.

== Relation with other conventions ==
Article 31 of the Hamburg Convention covers its entry into force, coupled to denunciation of other Rules. Within five years after entry into force of the Hamburg Rules, ratifying states must denounce earlier conventions, specifically the Hague and Hague-Visby Rules.

A long-standing aim has been to have a uniform set of rules to govern carriage of goods, but there are now five different sets: Hague, Hague-Visby, Hague-Visby/SDR, Hamburg and Rotterdam. (The Rotterdam Rules are not yet in force).

== Ratifications ==
As of July 2025, the convention had been ratified by 36 States:

| Country | Comments |
|---|---|
| Albania | |
| Austria | |
| Barbados | |
| Botswana | |
| Burkina Faso | |
| Burundi | |
| Cameroon | |
| Chile | |
| Czech Republic | |
| Dominican Republic | |
| Ecuador | |
| Egypt | |
| Gambia | |
| Georgia | |
| Guinea | |
| Hungary | |
| Jordan | |
| Kazakhstan | |
| Kenya | |
| Lebanon | |
| Lesotho | |
| Liberia | |
| Malawi | |
| Morocco | |
| Nigeria | |
| Paraguay | |
| Peru | |
| Romania | |
| Saint Vincent and the Grenadines | |
| Senegal | |
| Sierra Leone | |
| Syria | |
| Tunisia | |
| Uganda | |
| Tanzania | |
| Zambia | |
