= Documentary collection =

Banking process for export of goods

A documentary collection is a process in which a seller instructs their bank to forward documents related to the export of goods to a buyer's bank with a request to present these documents to the buyer for payment, indicating when and on what conditions these documents can be released to the buyer.

The buyer may obtain possession of goods and clear them through customs, if the buyer has the shipping documents (original bill of lading, certificate of origin, etc.). The documents, however, are only released to the buyer after payment has been made ("Documents against Payment") or payment undertaking has been given - the buyer has accepted a bill of exchange issued by the seller and payable at a certain date in the future (maturity date) ("Documents against Acceptance").

Documentary Collections facilitate import/export operations. They do not provide the same level of security as Letters of Credit, but, as a result, the costs are lower. Unlike the Letters of Credit, for a Documentary Collection, the bank acts as a channel for the documents but does not issue any payment covenants (does not guarantee payment). The bank that has received a documentary collection may debit the buyer's account and make payment only if authorised by the buyer.

== Possibilities and advantages ==
Make international trade operations more flexible, Use Documentary Collection in cases when the seller does not want to deliver goods to the buyer on "open account" basis, but due to a long-term stable business relationship between the parties there is no need for security provided by a Letter of Credit or payment guarantee, Documentary collection is suitable to the seller: if the seller has no doubts about the buyer's ability to meet its payment obligations, if the political and economic situation in the buyer's country is stable, if there are no foreign exchange restrictions in the seller's country; Documentary collection is convenient for the buyer because: there is no need for an advance payment; payment for goods can be made when shipping documents have been received, in cases of documents released against acceptance the buyer has the possibility to sell the goods first and afterwards make payment to the seller. Documentary Collection assures the seller that the shipping documents will be released to the buyer only upon payment or acceptance of a Bill of Exchange.
