= Hague–Visby Rules =

1968 rules describing responsibilities and liabilities of ship owners for cargo

International Convention for the Unification of Certain Rules of Law relating to Bills of Lading (1924)/ First Protocol (1968)/ Second Protocol (1979)
- Drafted: 25 August 1924/23 February 1968/21 December 1979
- Effective: 2 June 1931/23 June 1977/24 February 1982
- Condition: After consultations/ 10 ratifications, of which 5 representing over 1 millions gross tonnage (first protocol)/ 5 ratifications (second protocol)
- Ratifiers: 86/24/19
- Depositary: Belgian Government
- Languages: French and English (protocols)

The Hague–Visby Rules are a set of international rules for the international carriage of goods by sea. They are a slightly updated version of the original Hague Rules which were drafted in Brussels in 1924.

The premise of the Hague–Visby Rules (and of the earlier English common law from which the Rules are drawn) was that a carrier typically has far greater bargaining power than the shipper, and that to protect the interests of the shipper/cargo-owner, the law should impose some minimum affreightment obligations upon the carrier. However, the Hague and Hague–Visby Rules were hardly a charter of new protections for cargo-owners; the English common law prior to 1924 provided more protection for cargo-owners, and imposed more liabilities upon "common carriers".

The official title of the Hague Rules is the "International Convention for the Unification of Certain Rules of Law relating to Bills of Lading". After being amended by the Brussels Amendments (officially the "Protocol to Amend the International Convention for the Unification of Certain Rules of Law Relating to Bills of Lading") in 1968, the Rules became known colloquially as the Hague–Visby Rules.

A final amendment was made in the SDR Protocol in 1979. Many countries declined to adopt the Hague–Visby Rules and stayed with the 1924 Hague Rules. Some other countries which upgraded to Hague-Visby subsequently failed to adopt the 1979 SDR protocol.

== Implementing legislation ==
The Hague–Visby Rules were incorporated into English law by the Carriage of Goods by Sea Act 1971, and the provisions of the statute and the text of the rules both apply in law. For instance, although Article I(c) of the Rules exempts live animals and deck cargo, section 1(7) restores those items into the category of "goods". Also, although Article III(4) declares a bill of lading to be a mere "prima facie evidence of the receipt by the carrier of the goods", the Carriage of Goods by Sea Act 1992 section 4 upgrades a bill of lading to be "conclusive evidence of receipt".

Under Article X, the Rules apply if ("a) the bill of lading is issued in a contracting State, or (b) the carriage is from a port in a contracting State, or (c) the contract (of carriage) provides that (the) Rules ... are to govern the contract". If the Rules apply, the entire text of Rules is incorporated into the contract of carriage, and any attempt to exclude the Rules is void under Article III (8).

== Carriers' duties ==
Under the Rules, the carrier's main duties are to "properly and carefully load, handle, stow, carry, keep, care for, and discharge the goods carried" and to "exercise due diligence to ... make the ship seaworthy" and to "... properly man, equip and supply the ship". It is implicit (from the common law) that the carrier must not deviate from the agreed route nor from the usual route; but Article IV(4) provides that "any deviation in saving or attempting to save life or property at sea or any reasonable deviation shall not be deemed to be an infringement or breach of these Rules".

The carrier's duties are not "strict", but require only a reasonable standard of professionalism and care; and Article IV allows the carrier a wide range of situations exempting them from liability on a cargo claim. These exemptions include destruction or damage to the cargo caused by: fire, perils of the sea, act of God, and act of war. A controversial provision exempts the carrier from liability for "neglect or default of the master ... in the navigation or in the management of the ship". This provision is considered unfair to the shipper; and both the later Hamburg Rules (which require contracting states to denounce the Hague–Visby Rules) and Rotterdam Rules (which are not yet in force) refuse exemption for negligent navigation and management.

Also, whereas the Hague–Visby Rules require a ship to be seaworthy only "before and at the beginning" of the voyage, under the Rotterdam Rules the carrier will have to keep the ship seaworthy throughout the voyage (although this new duty will be to a reasonable standard that is subject to the circumstances of being at sea).

== Shipper's duties ==
In contrast, the shipper has fewer obligations (mostly implicit), namely: (i) to pay freight; (ii) to pack the goods sufficiently for the journey; (iii) to describe the goods honestly and accurately; (iv) not to ship dangerous cargoes (unless agreed by both parties); and (v) to have the goods ready for shipment as agreed; (q.v. "notice of readiness to load"). None of these shippers' obligations are enforceable under the Rules; instead they would give rise to a normal action in contract.

== Criticism ==
With only 10 articles, the rules have the virtue of brevity, but they have several faults. When, after 44 years of experience, the 1924 rules were updated with a single minor amendment, they still covered only carriage wholly by sea (thereby ignoring multi-modal transport), and they barely acknowledged the container revolution of the 1950s. Also, UNCTAD felt that they had actually diluted the protection to shippers once provided by English common law, and proposed instead the more modern Hamburg Rules of 1978, which were embraced by many developing countries, but largely ignored by ship-operating nations. The modern Rotterdam Rules, with some 96 articles, have far more scope and cover multi-modal transport but remain far from general implementation.

== Ratifications ==
A list of ratifications and denouncements of the three conventions is shown below:

| Country | Hague | Hague-Visby | Hague-SDR | Comments |
| | 1924 | 1968 | 1979 | |
|---|---|---|---|---|
| Algeria | Active | | | |
| Angola | Active | | | |
| Antigua and Barbuda | Active | | | |
| Argentina | Active | | | |
| Aruba | Denounced | Active | Active | |
| Australia | Denounced | Active | | |
| Bahamas | Active | | | |
| Barbados | Active | | | |
| Belgium | Active | Active | Active | |
| Belize | Active | | | |
| Bolivia | Active | | | |
| Cameroon | Active | | | |
| Cape Verde | Active | | | |
| China | | | | |
| Croatia | Active | Active | Active | |
| Côte d'Ivoire | Active | | | |
| Cuba | Active | | | |
| Cyprus | Active | | | |
| Democratic Republic of the Congo | Active | | | |
| Denmark | Denounced | Active | Active | |
| Dominica | Active | | | |
| East Germany | Active | | Active | Part of present-day Germany |
| Egypt | Active | Denounced | | |
| Ecuador | Active | Active | | |
| Fiji | Active | | | |
| Finland | Denounced | Active | Active | |
| France | Active | Active | Active | |
| Gambia | Active | | | |
| Georgia | | Active | | |
| Greece | | | Active | |
| Grenada | Active | | | |
| Guinea-Bissau | Active | | | |
| Guyana | Active | | | |
| Hong Kong | Denounced | Active | Active | |
| Hungary | Active | | | |
| Iran | Active | | | |
| Ireland | Active | | | |
| Israel | Active | | | |
| Italy | Denounced | Active | Active | |
| Jamaica | Active | | | |
| Japan | Denounced | | Active | |
| Kenya | Active | | | |
| Kiribati | Active | | | |
| Kuwait | Active | | | |
| Latvia | Active | Active | Active | |
| Lebanon | Denounced | Denounced | | |
| Lithuania | Active | Active | Active | |
| Luxembourg | | | Active | |
| Macao | Active | | | |
| Madagascar | Active | | | |
| Malaysia | Active | | | |
| Mauritius | Active | | | |
| Mexico | | | Active | |
| Monaco | Active | | | |
| Mozambique | Active | | | |
| Nauru | Active | | | |
| Netherlands | Denounced | Active | Active | |
| New Zealand | | | Active | |
| Nigeria | Denounced | | | |
| North Borneo | Active | | | Part of present-day Malaysia, but during ratification a British protectorate |
| Norway | Denounced | Active | Active | |
| Palestine | Active | | | A mandated territory under British control on ratification. Area includes present day Israel |
| Papua New Guinea | Active | | | |
| Paraguay | Denounced | | | |
| Peru | Inactive | | | |
| Poland | Active | Active | Active | |
| Portugal | Active | | | |
| Portuguese India | Active | | | Part of the present-day Indian state of Goa |
| Portuguese Timor | Active | | | Now Timor-Leste. Ratification was received in 1952 when it was under Portuguese control |
| Romania | Denounced | | | |
| Russia | | | Active | |
| (Saint Kitts and Nevis) Saint Christopher and Nevis | Active | | | |
| Saint Lucia | Active | | | |
| Saint Vincent and the Grenadines | Denounced | | | |
| São Tomé and Príncipe | Active | | | |
| Sarawak | Active | | | Part of present-day Malaysia, but during ratification a British protectorate |
| Senegal | Active | | | |
| Seychelles | Active | | | |
| Sierra Leone | Active | | | |
| Singapore | Active | Active | | |
| Somalia | Active | | | |
| Slovenia | Active | | | |
| Solomon Islands | Active | | | |
| Spain | Denounced | | Active | Hague denounced with effect from the entry into force of the Hague Rules. |
| Sri Lanka | Active | Active | | |
| Sweden | Denounced | Active | Active | |
| Switzerland | Active | Active | Active | |
| Syria | Active | Active | | |
| Tanganyika | Active | | | Presently known as Tanzania. Upon ratification under British control |
| Tonga | Active | Active | | |
| Trinidad and Tobago | Active | | | |
| Turkey | Active | | | |
| Tuvalu | Active | | | |
| United Kingdom | Denounced | Active | Active | |
| United States | Active | | | |
| West Germany | Active | | | Part of present-day Germany |
| Yugoslavia | Active | | | |

== See also ==
- Seaworthiness (law)
- Carriage of Goods by Sea Act 1971
- Carriage of Goods by Sea Act 1992
