= Comité Maritime International =

International maritime law organization

- Abbreviation: CMI
- Formation: 1897
- Type: Non-governmental organization
- Headquarters: Ernest van Dijckkaai 8, B-2000 Antwerpen, Belgium
- President: Ann Fenech
- Website: https://comitemaritime.org/

The Comité Maritime International (CMI) is an international maritime law organization. Formed in 1897 in Antwerp, the CMI aims to unify maritime law internationally. It is the first and oldest operating international organization dedicated to maritime law and the second most important maritime organization after the IMO.

== Background ==
The first Maritime Law Association was formed in Belgium in 1896. This early organization aimed to work towards the unification of maritime law from the outset. In 1897, the CMI was formed by creating a supranational organization uniting the first two maritime law associations.

In 2022 Ann Fenech of Malta was elected president, making her the first female president of the CMI.

== Organization ==
The CMI consists of national member organizations (such as the Maritime Law Association of the United States) that represent their country of origin; these national organizations work to harmonize maritime law.
