= Rotterdam Rules =

2009 admiralty law convention

United Nations Convention on Contracts for the International Carriage of Goods Wholly or Partly by Sea
- Signatories (red) and Ratifications (green)
- Drafted: 11 December 2008
- Signed: 23 September 2009
- Location: Rotterdam and New York
- Effective: (not yet in force)
- Condition: Ratification by 20 states
- Signatories: 25
- Ratifiers: 5 (Republic of the Congo, Spain, Togo, Cameroon and Benin)
- Depositary: UN Secretary-General
- Languages: Arabic, Chinese, English, French, Russian and Spanish

The "Rotterdam Rules" (formally, the United Nations Convention on Contracts for the International Carriage of Goods Wholly or Partly by Sea) is a treaty proposing new international rules to revise the legal framework for maritime affreightment and carriage of goods by sea. The Rules primarily address the legal relationship between carriers and cargo-owners.

The aim of the convention is to extend and modernize existing international rules and achieve uniformity of International trade law in the field of maritime carriage, updating or replacing many provisions in the Hague Rules, Hague-Visby Rules and Hamburg Rules. The convention establishes a comprehensive, uniform legal regime governing the rights and obligations of shippers, carriers and consignees under a contract for door-to-door shipments that involve international sea transport.

Although the final text was greeted with much enthusiasm, a decade later, little has happened. As of December 2019, the rules are not yet in force as they have been ratified by only five states, four of which are minor West African states which possess relatively little global influence. The Rotterdam Rules are extensive, with nearly ten times as many Articles as existing "tackle-to-tackle only" Rules. Although some have argued that the new Rules have flaws, the Hague-Visby Rules which dominate the sector are insufficient for modern multimodal transport. One possible way forward might be the interim adoption of a "Rotterdam-Lite Convention".

== History ==
The Hague Rules of 1924 were updated in 1968 to become the Hague-Visby Rules, but the changes were modest. The modified convention still covered only "tackle to tackle" carriage contracts, with no provision for multimodal transport. The industry-changing phenomenon of containerization was barely acknowledged. The 1978 Hamburg Rules were introduced to provide a framework that was both more modern, and less biased in favour of ship operators. Although the Hamburg Rules were readily adopted by developing countries, the new convention was shunned by richer countries who stuck with Hague and Hague-Visby. It had been expected that a Hague/Hamburg compromise might arise, but instead the vast (96 articles) Rotterdam Rules appeared.

The final draft of the Rotterdam Rules, which was assembled by the United Nations Commission on International Trade Law, was adopted by the United Nations on 11 December 2008, and a signing ceremony was held in Rotterdam on 23 September 2009. Signatories included the United States, France, Greece, Denmark, Switzerland and the Netherlands; in all, signatures were obtained from countries said to make up 25 percent of world trade by volume. Signatures were allowed after the ceremony at the U.N. Headquarters in New York City, United States.

The World Shipping Council is a prominent supporter of the Rotterdam Rules. In 2010, the American Bar Association House of Delegates approved a resolution supporting U.S. ratification of the Rotterdam Rules.

== Main provisions ==
The following are critical provisions and law changes found in the Rotterdam Rules:

- The Rules apply only if the carriage includes a sea leg; other multimodal carriage contracts which have no sea leg are outside of the scope of the Rules.
- It extends the period that carriers are responsible for goods, to cover the time between the point where the goods are received to the point where the goods are delivered.
- It allows for more e-commerce and approves more forms of electronic documentation.
- It increases the limit liability of carriers to 875 units of account per shipping unit or three units of account per kilogram of gross weight.
- It eliminates the "nautical fault defence" which had protected carriers and crew from liability for negligent ship management and navigation.
- It extends the time that legal claims can be filed to two years following the day the goods were delivered or should have been delivered.
- It allows parties to so-called "Volume Contracts" to opt-out of some liability rules set in the convention.
- It obliges carriers to keep ships seaworthy and properly crewed throughout the voyage. The standard of care is not "strict", but "due diligence" (as with the Hague Rules).

== Entry into force and ratifications ==
The Rotterdam Rules will enter into effect a year after 20 countries have ratified that treaty. As of 9 August 2011, there were 24 signatories to the treaty. The most recent country to sign the treaty was Sweden, which signed on 20 July 2011. Spain was the first country to ratify the convention in January 2011. An overview of signatures and ratifications is shown below:

Upon entry into force of the convention for a country, it should denounce the conventions governing the Hague-Visby Rules as well as the Hamburg Rules as the convention does not come into effect without such denouncements.

Country	Signature	Ratification/Accession
Armenia	29 September 2009	
Benin		7 November 2019
Cameroon	29 September 2009	11 October 2017
Congo	23 September 2009	28 January 2014
Democratic Republic of the Congo	23 September 2010	
Denmark	23 September 2009	
France	23 September 2009	
Gabon	23 September 2009	
Ghana	23 September 2009	
Greece	23 September 2009	
Guinea	23 September 2009	
Guinea-Bissau	24 September 2013	
Luxembourg	31 August 2010	
Madagascar	25 September 2009	
Mali	26 October 2009	
Netherlands	23 September 2009	
Niger	22 October 2009	
Nigeria	23 September 2009	
Norway	23 September 2009	
Poland	23 September 2009	
Senegal	23 September 2009	
Spain	23 September 2009	19 January 2011
Sweden	20 July 2011	
Switzerland	23 September 2009	
Togo	23 September 2009	17 July 2012
United States	23 September 2009	

== See also ==
- Hague-Visby Rules
- Hamburg Rules
- Seaworthiness (law)
- Article "Rotterdam Rules in a Nutshell" 2010
