= Hague Rules =

1924 admiralty law convention

The Hague Rules of 1924 (formally the "International Convention for the Unification of Certain Rules of Law relating to Bills of Lading, and Protocol of Signature") is an international convention to impose minimum standards upon commercial carriers of goods by sea. Previously, only the common law provided protection to cargo-owners; but the Hague Rules should not be seen as a "consumers' charter" for shippers because the 1924 Convention actually favoured carriers and reduced their obligations to shippers.

The Hague Rules represented the first attempt by the international community to find a workable and uniform way to address the problem of shipowners regularly excluding themselves from all liability for loss or damage to cargo. The objective of the Hague Rules was to establish a minimum mandatory liability of carriers.

Under the Hague Rules the shipper bears the cost of lost/damaged goods if they cannot prove that the vessel was unseaworthy, improperly manned or unable to safely transport and preserve the cargo, i.e. the carrier can avoid liability for risks resulting from human errors provided they exercise due diligence and their vessel is properly manned and seaworthy. These provisions have frequently been the subject of discussion between shipowners and cargo interests on whether they provide an appropriate balance in liability.

The Hague Rules form the basis of national legislation in almost all of the world's major trading nations, and cover nearly all the present international shipping.

== Amendments and developments ==
The Hague Rules have been updated by two protocols, but neither addressed the basic liability provisions, which remain unchanged. The rules were also slightly amended (beginning in 1931, and further in 1977 and 1982) to become the Hague-Visby Rules. In addition, the U.N. established a fairer and more modern set of rules, the Hamburg Rules (effective 1992). Also a more radical and extensive set of rules is the Rotterdam Rules, but as of August 2020, only 5 states have ratified these rules, so they are not yet in force.
