= Multimodal transport =

Carriage of goods under a single contract

Multimodal transport (also known as combined transport) is the transportation of goods under a single contract, but performed with at least two different modes of transport; the carrier is liable (in a legal sense) for the entire carriage, even though it is performed by several different modes of transport (by rail, sea and road, for example). The carrier does not have to possess all the means of transport, and in practice usually does not; the carriage is often performed by sub-carriers (referred to in legal language as "actual carriers"). The carrier responsible for the entire carriage is referred to as a multimodal transport operator, or MTO.

Article 1.1. of the United Nations Convention on International Multimodal Transport of Goods (Geneva, 24 May 1980) (which will only enter into force 12 months after 30 countries ratify; as of May 2019, only 6 countries have ratified the treaty) defines multimodal transport as follows: "'International multimodal transport' means the carriage of goods by at least two different modes of transport on the basis of a multimodal transport contract from a place in one country at which the goods are taken in charge by the multimodal transport operator to a place designated for delivery situated in a different country".

== Overview ==
In practice, freight forwarders have become important MTOs; they have moved away from their traditional role as agents for the sender, accepting a greater liability as carriers. Large sea carriers have also evolved into MTOs; they provide customers with so-called door-to-door service. The sea carrier offers transport from the sender's premises (usually located inland) to the receiver's premises (also usually situated inland), rather than offering traditional tackle-to-tackle or pier-to-pier service. MTOs not in the possession of a sea vessel (even though the transport includes a sea leg) are referred to as Non-Vessel Operating Carriers (NVOC) in common law countries (especially the United States).

Multimodal transport developed in connection with the "container revolution" of the 1960s and 1970s; as of 2011, containerized transports are by far the most important multimodal consignments. However, it is important to remember that multimodal transport is not equivalent to container transport; multimodal transport is feasible without any form of container. The MTO works on behalf of the supplier; it assures the supplier (and the buyer) that their goods will be effectively managed and supplied.

== Research ==
=== Influence of container on multimodalism ===
Multimodal transport research is being conducted across a wide range of government, commercial and academic centers. The Research and Innovative Technology Administration (RITA) within the U.S. Department of Transportation (USDOT) chairs an inter-agency Research, Development and Technology (RD&T) Planning Team. The University Transportation Center (UTC) program, which consists of more than 100 universities nationwide conducts multi-modal research and education programs. The European Commission has invested heavily in multimodal research under the H2020 programme – examples are CORE and SYNCHRO-NET.

== Legal aspects ==
From a legal standpoint, multimodal transport creates several problems. Unimodal transports are currently governed by different, often-mandatory international conventions. These conventions stipulate different bases for liability, and different limitations of liability for the carrier. As of 2011, the solution to this problem has been the so-called network principle. According to the network principle, the different conventions coexist unchanged; the carrier's liability is defined according to where the breach of contract has occurred (where the goods have been damaged during transport, for example). However, problems arise if the breach of contract is systemic (not localized).

== See also ==
- Intermodal freight transport
- Intermodal passenger transport
