= Simon Davies =

Simon Davies may refer to:

- Simon Davies (privacy advocate), British advocate
- Simon Davies (footballer, born 1974), Welsh international footballer (born in England), former Chester City F.C. manager
- Simon Davies (footballer, born 1979), Welsh international footballer (born in Haverfordwest), whose clubs have included Tottenham Hotspur and Fulham
- Simon Davies (English TV presenter) (born 1963), English designer, interior decorator and television presenter working in Sweden
- Simon Davies (Welsh TV presenter) (born 1959), Welsh television presenter and former actor
- Simon Davies (solicitor) (born 1967), British lawyer
- Simon J Davies, British nephrologist

== See also ==
- Simon Davis (disambiguation)
