= Civil-law notary =

Lawyer of noncontentious private civil law

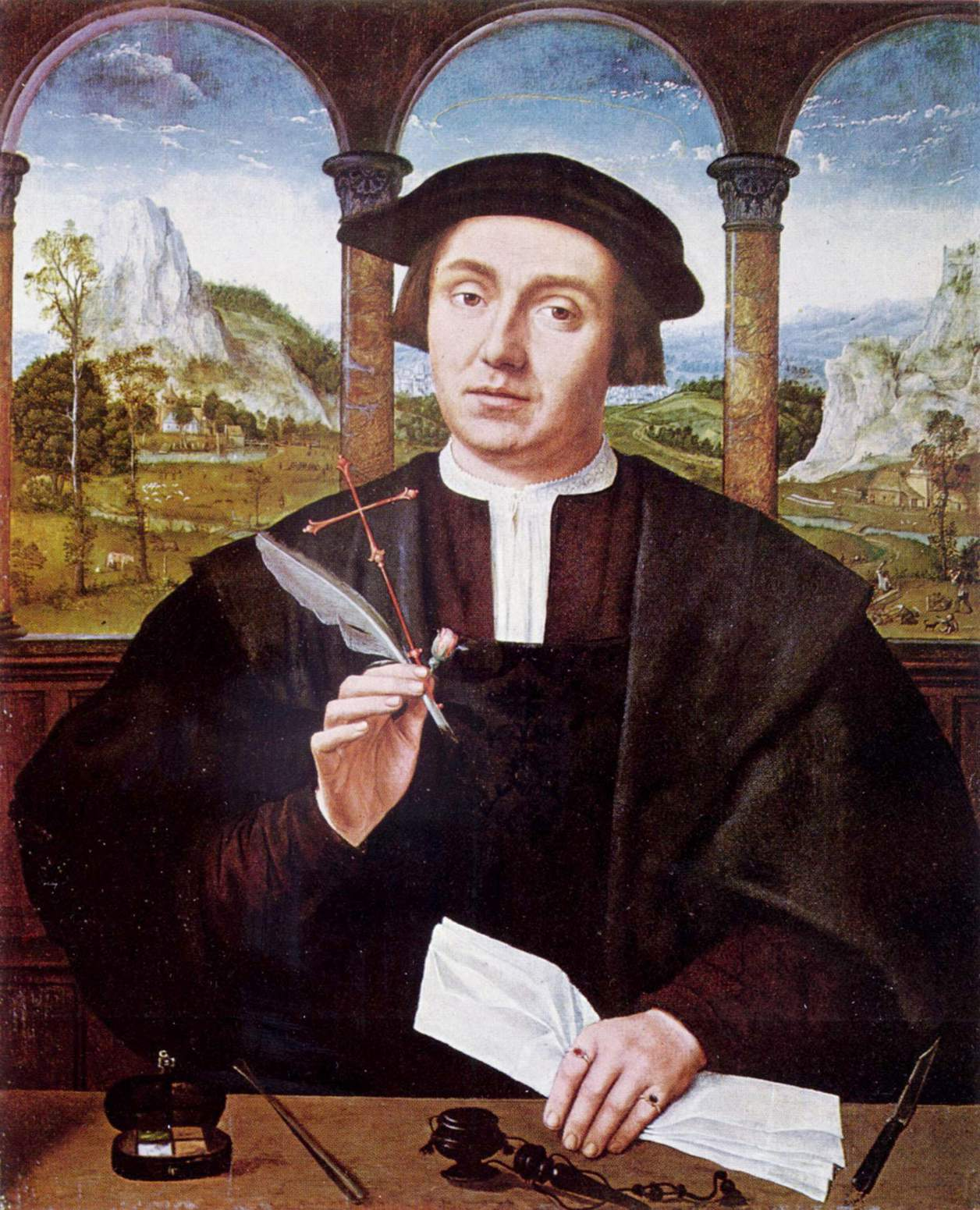
16th-century painting of a civil law notary, by Flemish painter Quentin Matsys

Civil-law notaries, or Latin notaries, are lawyers of noncontentious private civil law who draft, take, and record legal instruments for private parties, provide legal advice and give attendance in person, and are vested as public officers with the authentication power of the state. As opposed to most notaries public, their common-law counterparts, civil-law notaries are highly trained, licensed practitioners providing a full range of regulated legal services, and whereas they hold a public office, they nonetheless operate usually—but not always—in private practice and are paid on a fee-for-service basis. They often receive generally the same education as attorneys at civil law with further specialised education but without qualifications in advocacy, procedural law or the law of evidence, somewhat comparable to a solicitor training in certain common-law countries. However, notaries only deal with non-contentious matters, as opposed to solicitors who may deal with both contentious and non-contentious matters.

Civil-law notaries are limited to areas of private law, that is, domestic law which regulates the relationships between individuals and in which the state is not directly concerned. The most common areas of practice for civil-law notaries are in residential and commercial conveyancing and registration, contract drafting, company formation, successions and estate planning, and powers of attorney. Ordinarily, they have no authority to appear in court on their client's behalf; their role is limited to drafting, authenticating, and registering certain types of transactional or legal instruments. In some countries, such as the Netherlands, France, Italy, or Québec (Canada) among others, they also retain and keep a minute copy of their instruments—in the form of memoranda—in notarial protocols, or archives.

Notaries generally hold undergraduate degrees in civil law and graduate degrees in notarial law. Notarial law involves expertise in a broad spectrum of private law including family law, estate and testamentary law, conveyancing and property law, the law of agency, and contract and company law. Student notaries must complete a long apprenticeship or articled clerkship as a trainee notary and usually spend some years as a junior associate in a notarial firm before working as a partner or opening a private practice. Any such practice is usually tightly regulated, and most countries parcel out areas into notarial districts with a set number of notary positions. This has the effect of making notarial appointments very limited.

== Notarial instruments ==
As a lawyer, a civil-law notary draws up and executes legal instruments called notarial instruments (Fr acte notarié, Sp instrumento notarial, It atto notarile, Du notariële akte, Ger notarielle Urkunde, Notariatsurkunde). To be valid, a notarial instrument must be signed contemporaneously (uno contextu) by the appearer(s) (parties to the instrument), sometimes in the presence of attesting witnesses, before the notary who also signs and officiates the signing ceremony.

=== Status at law ===
Notarial instruments, if prima facie duly executed, are:

- presumed valid and regular;
- self-authenticating;
- probative (i.e., proof of their contents);
- public;
- self-executing; and
- have a data certa, i.e., a fixed, unalterable effective date.

Traditionally, notarial instruments trigger a præsumptio veritatis et solemnitatis entailing two consequences—regularity and probativity. First, being an official act, a presumption of regularity attaches to the instrument, meaning all prescribed formalities have been carried out, including the reading over of the instrument. Second, a notarial instrument is self-authenticating and probative, i.e., it constitutes full proof of the agreement it contains, as against the parties, their heirs, and successors. It also means the notary's firsthand (de visu et auditu suis sensibus) narrations of fact are conclusively presumed true and correct, whereas secondhand narrations (appearers' representations) are merely assertio notarii which are rebuttably presumed valid. While all notarial instruments are official documents, they are not all necessarily public; most instruments are in public form, meaning an original is retained in publica custodia by the notary in his or her protocol or recorded with a public registry, but some are in private form, that is, a single original is issued directly to the appearer(s). In either case, the appearer always walks away with an instrument that is self-executing, that is, it requires no further implementing action to be effective and enforceable, just like a court order. Finally, notarial instruments have a fixed effective or signature date (data certa) that cannot be ante- or postdated, or left blank and filled in after signing.

==== Secondary effects ====
Notarial instruments cannot be altered or overridden by prior or subsequent instruments under hand (e.g., simple contracts). In other words, for example, a notarial will could not be amended or superseded by a non-notarial codicil or will. They also estop (preclude) an appearer as contract denier from raising most affirmative defenses as to enforceability, including: (1) non est factum, (2) the contents do not correctly express the appearers' intentions, and (3) defenses against formation (e.g., ultra vires, lack of capacity, improper execution, etc.).

One thing that distinguishes a civil-law notary's instruments from those of a common lawyer is the fact that, under common law legal systems, drafts and non-identical copies are considered separate documents, while under civil law public documents may be proved by secondary evidence. An unexecuted minute is deemed firsthand proof of an instrument and considered the original, whereas the engrossment is not. The minute is, therefore, the authenticum, or original instrument of writing, as distinguished from the self-executing copy, or instrumentum.

==== Rebuttal ====
A notarial instrument's “valid” portions are open to direct rebuttal, but the “conclusive” portions can, in some jurisdictions, only be rebutted by an action of improbation (Fr inscription de faux, It querela di falso, Germ Fälschungsklage) in which a challenger must bring a collateral attack against the instrument, proving a willful material error by strong, clear, and positively convincing proof, rather than the ordinary preponderance of evidence standard in civil actions. Legally, a successful challenge must overcome the praesumptio iustae causa which attaches to a notarial instrument, the result of which is that said instrument is presumed to have been made or formed with a iusta causa, that is, sufficient legal consideration (causa). This presumption stems from the fact that a notary is expected to verify the facts, assertions, or events mentioned in his act, thereby assuming liability for and giving warrant to its contents. A successfully improbated instrument is null and set aside.

=== Forms ===
Nowadays, a public-form instrument is prepared first as an unexecuted original called a minute (Fr minute, It minuta, Sp matriz, Du minuut, Ger Urschrift). The minute is archived in the draftsman notary's protocol (Fr protocole, It protocollo, Sp protocolo, Ger Urkundenrolle). The instrument's particulars—appearer, fees, subject matter, witnesses, date, and so forth—are noted or minuted in a register or logbook. From the minute the notary extends a fully engrossed execution copy, known as an engrossment (Fr/Du grosse, It rogito, Sp testimonio, copia autorizada, Ger Ausfertigung), which is self-executing since it contains not only the material terms but also solemn and statutory notarial wording and, in some jurisdictions, enacting clauses like those found on court orders. It is also the only copy that has fresh signatures and seals on it. The engrossed copy is issued directly to the appearer(s). However, appearers are generally only entitled to one engrossment, so any other copy issued thereafter is a notarial exemplified copy which does not contain the appearers' fresh signatures and lacks the formalities of the engrossment; exemplified copies (Fr expédition, It copia conforme, Sp copia certificada, copia simple, Du uitgift, authentiek afschrift, Ger beglaubigte Abschrift) are therefore only for reference purposes.

Certain types of instruments are passed in private form, that is, only one copy—the original—is made and issued to the appearer while the draftsman notary does not retain a copy. Private-form instruments are usually unilateral, have short-term legal effect, and do not benefit third parties, such as certificates of good standing, powers of attorney, certificates of dishonor, statutory declarations, verifications of fact, rent and pay receipts, and pension and annuity arrears documents.

Additionally, some jurisdictions, especially those influenced by the Austrian Civil Code, divide notarial instruments into three types:

- operative (Aust Notariatsakt, Du partij-akte, Sp escritura pública): memorializes and effects irrevocable legal business; includes all transactional and governing instruments;
- declaratory (Aust Notariatsprotokoll, Du proces-verbaal akte, Sp acta notarial): records or notifies legal actions, facts, or rights; includes statutory declarations, company minutes, and registry memorials;
- certificatory (Germ notarielle Beglaubigung, Du notariële waarmerking, Sp certificación notarial): attests personal status details; includes life certificates, certificates of good standing, copy certifications, signature attestations.

== France ==
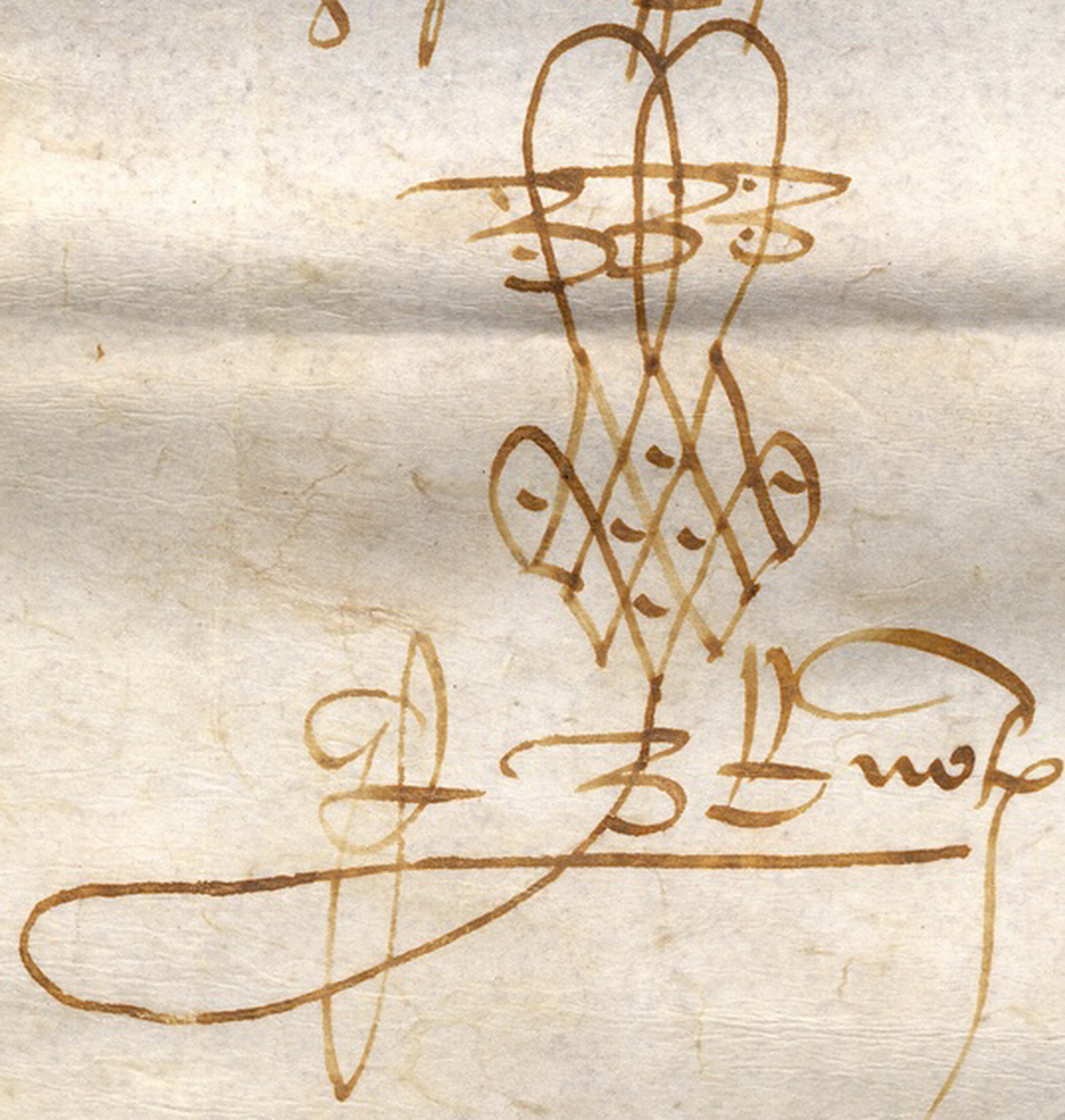
1400 French royal notary flourish

A French civil-law notary, or notaire, is a highly specialized lawyer in private practice appointed as a public officer by the justice minister. The profession began admitting women in 1948, and by the start of 2008 women numbered 2,104 and accounted for 24.2% of all notaries. A notarial office (étude) usually includes ancillary staff like notaries' clerks (clerc de notaire) of different kinds, e.g., junior (clerc employé), specialist (clerc technicien), and supervisory clerks (clerc cadre). Each level is divided into at least three pay grades, as well as legal secretaries, trainee notaries (notaire stagiaire), and accountants. In smaller offices, succession clerks are kept separate since their work differs significantly from other practice areas; in larger firms, clerks are separated into divisions by specialization. While most clerks are caseworkers, some work as costing specialists or formalities clerks. Secretaries oftentimes go on to pursue clerking.

=== Education ===
Notaries and notaries' clerks—a form of paralegal—earn undergraduate law degrees (diplôme de notariat de 1^{er} cycle) from an accredited notarial law school (école de notariat). Managing clerks (principal clerc) must obtain a special graduate clerking degree (diplôme de premier clerc).

Law graduates must then earn a 1-year master's degree in law (MCL) (master 1 en droit) and either continue in a university law school or enroll at a notary institute (centre de formation professionnelle notariale) to earn a second graduate degree in notarial law for which specializations exist, including: conflict of laws, advanced tax law, overseas territories, EU law, struggling businesses, company law, intellectual property, farm tenancy and agri-business, city planning and environmental law, and estate planning.

There are 2 postgraduate options: a university track (voie universitaire) and a vocational track (voie professionnelle).

- University track: 1 year of university coursework for a Master's in notarial law (master 2 en droit notarial), followed by a 2-year, in-office traineeship (stage de notaire), supplemented with 4 semester-long practice courses and capped by a Master's thesis. At the end the graduate receives a diplôme supérieur de notariat.
- Vocational track: begins with a competitive entrance exam in applied legal studies and is followed by 1 year of institute coursework for a Postgraduate Diploma in Notarial Practice (diplôme d'aptitude aux fonctions de notaire). Students must also complete a 2-year traineeship supplemented with 6 week-long practice seminars.

Formerly, there was a non-degree option involving a lengthy apprenticeship. In addition, notaries' clerks with a minimum of 9 years of in-office experience, with 6 of those spent as a junior clerk, as well as judges and attorneys/solicitors of 6 years standing, may become a notary by passing a professional exam. Notaries are also required to attend regular continuing education courses and seminars.

=== Practice ===
In France, notarial instruments, whether in public (en minute) or private form (en brevet), have a high degree of authority and are considered probative instruments (acte authentique), received as firsthand and primary evidence in court, and thereby accorded high evidentiary value and executory force, and deemed to be proof of their contents. A notarial instrument also fixes the date at which its parties are bound without prior delivery and acceptance (as opposed to a deed or contract under common law) and the data certa (Note: Under French law a legal instrument is said to have a date certaine, or fixed effective date, at signing if in public form or upon acknowledgement if in private form and which cannot be altered, i.e., ante- or postdated. The data certa is the date from which time limits or terms are determined and when third-party benefits commence or privity of contract is in force. It is not a date certain.) (date certaine) of the act's execution so as to safeguard against third party claims. To be rebutted or challenged, a notarial act must be subjected to a rescissory action called an improbation action (inscription de faux) to prove the act contains errors or has been maliciously altered, interlineated, edited, or falsified.

Notaries engage in a wide variety of legal activities ranging from contract drafting and legal advising—primarily in company, family, and property law. Roughly 50% of French notarial business involves real estate conveyancing, leasing, and construction. Domestic affairs, e.g., adoptions, marital agreements, divorces, and the like, as well as estate planning account for another 26%. Preparing notarial acts for private parties, informing parties as to the scope of their contractual obligations, ensuring that the instrument or contract is fair and unbiased, and acting as a non-contentious and impartial advocate for the business transaction as a whole, notaries prevent and resolve many potential conflicts beforehand.

Notaries have a monopoly on marital agreements, marital property systems, estate administration, and conveyancing (realty sales, mortgages, etc.). They are also experts in the law of property with exclusive access to France's M.I.N. database which contains all property transfer and conveyance information. This gives notaries a singular advantage in gauging the property market, thus allowing them to appraise property, conduct transactions, and handle taxes and financing.

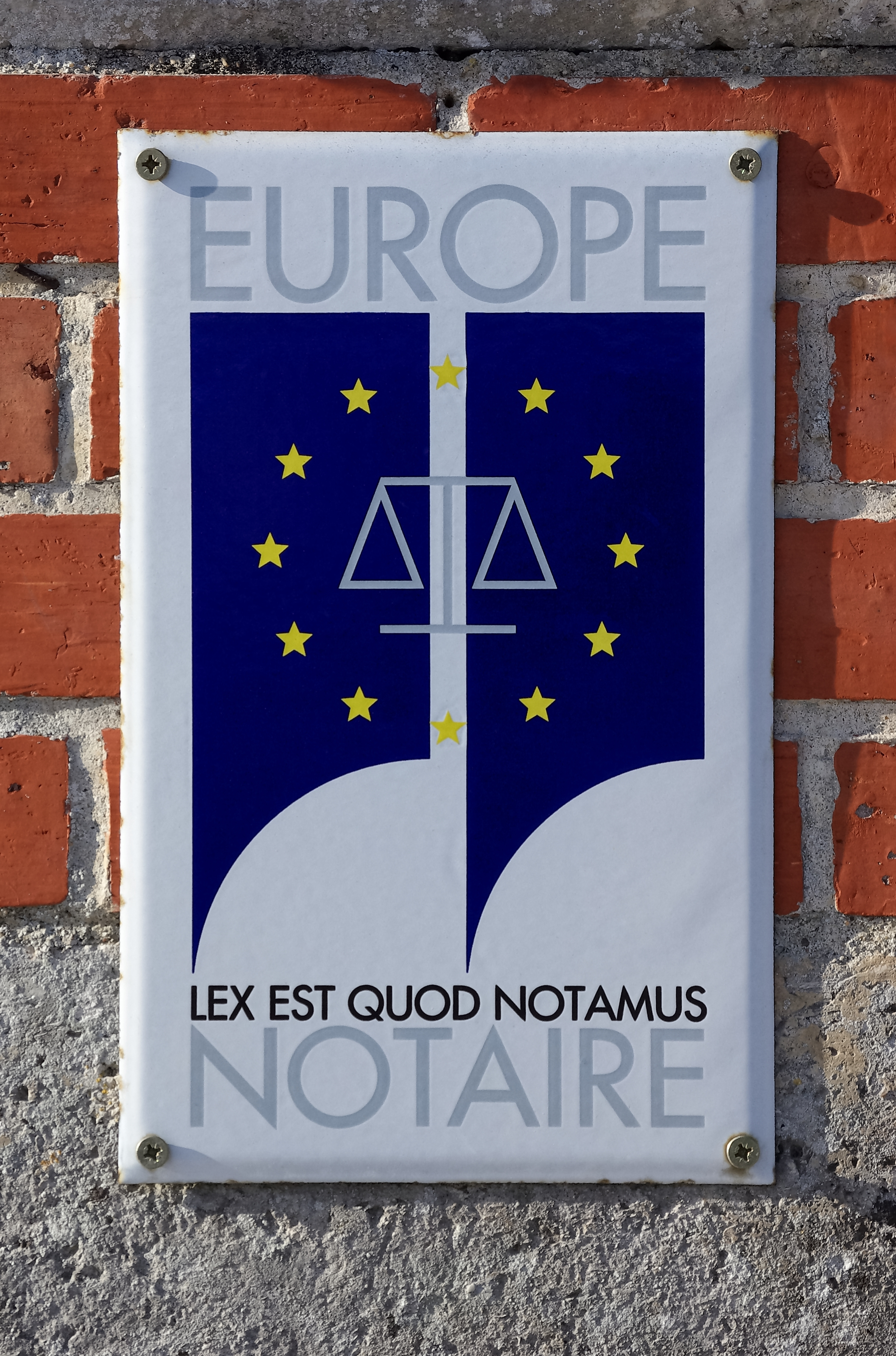

In France, when a notarial act is passed before one notary subscribing, it is said to be ordinaire, or in simple form, and when before two notaries with the second attesting, then it is solennel, or in solemn form. (Note: Used, for instance, for notarial wills, an illiterate subscriber, or a forced heir's renunciation of inheritance.) Acts may be drawn up in public or private form, said en minute and en brevet respectively. When drawn in private form, the single executed original is issued to the client, and its particulars are logged in the notary's register. When in public form, one un-executed minute copy (minute) is retained of record in the notary's protocol, thereby constituting a public instrument, and a fully engrossed execution copy (called a grosse and now termed copie exécutoire) is issued to the client and is headed and footed with the same formule exécutoire (Note: The formule exécutoire or "enactment clause" reads in French at an act's head: République française, au nom du peuple français, in English, 'Republic of France, in the name of the people of France'; and at the foot: En conséquence, la République Française mande et ordonne à tous Huissiers de Justice sur ce requis de mettre la dite décision à exécution, aux Procureurs Généraux et aux Procureurs de la République près les Tribunaux de Grande Instance d'y tenir la main à tous Commandants et Officiers de la Force Publique de prêter main-forte lorsqu'ils en seront légalement requis. En foi de quoi, les présentes établies sur (...) feuillets ont été collationnées, reconnues conformes à la minute, signées, scellées et délivrées par M^{e} NAME, notaire à LOCATION. Pour première copie éxécutoire.; in English, this means "Therefore, hereby commanded and directed are all marshals and sheriffs to carry out this writ, all prosecutors to abide thereby, and all law enforcement officers to provide assistance when legally required to do so. In testimoney whereof , the foregoing, consisting of X pages, is a true and correct copy of the minute hereof, to certify which I have granted these presents under my notarial firm and seal. True Engrossed Copy Attest.".) or "enactment clause" used on court orders and writs. Minutes and engrossments are only drawn up once, and, should a past client lose their copy or need further copies, by law, said person may only receive exemplifications (expédition, now termed copie authentique) (Note: Ended in French with: POUR COPIE AUTHENTIQUE. LE SOUSSIGNÉ, dont le nom figure sur le sceau apposé ci-dessous, Notaire à xxx, CERTIFIE, la présente copie authentique établie sur dix-neuf pages, exactement collationnée et conforme à la minute de l'acte (dont elle est la reproduction.); in English, "A TRUE EXEMPLIFIED COPY. I, Notary of X, whose name appearing in the seal hereinabove affixed, DO HEREBY CERTIFY AND ATTEST that these presents, consisting of 19 pages, are a true copy of the original of which it purports to be a copy, I having carefully collated and compared said copy with the said original and found the same to agree therewith.".) of the act. Notaries also issue detailed or summary abstracts of acts (extrait authentique) and make notarial certified copies (copie collationnée) of documents not in their custody.

=== Professional organizations ===
All French notaries are jointly and severally liable for professional errors in the performance of their duties. When liable, damages are paid from a nationwide consolidated indemnity fund. Group liability of this kind is otherwise unprecedented. Notaries are therefore required to take out professional indemnity insurance for the due protection of their clients. French notaries are part of and regulated by a local or county notaries society, or chambre des notaires, on whose advice notaries are appointed and who conduct annual accounting audits of notarial offices, establish and regulate professional and ethical standards, and can censure or temporarily suspend notaries. Notaries are also members of a regional notaries council (conseil des notaires) which acts very much like a common-law college of notaries by providing continuing education and other support services to notaries; they also take disciplinary action against notary misconduct including dismissal, removal from office, and revoking a notary's license to practice. The regional councils are governed and headed by the National Council of Notaries (Conseil supérieur du notariat) which conducts surprise inspections, provides research, outlook, and public relations services, and acts as the profession's administrative head.

== Germany ==
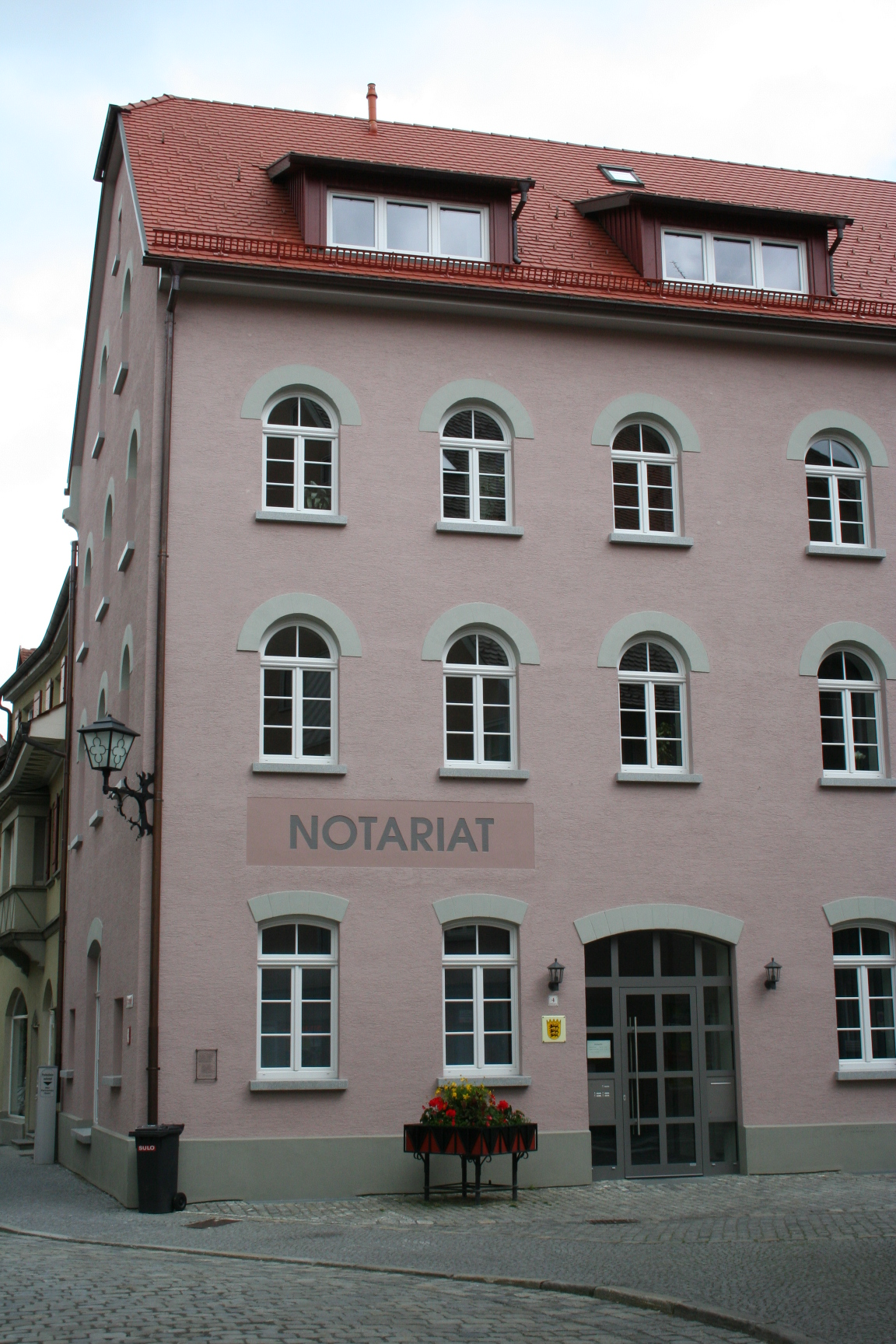
Notar office

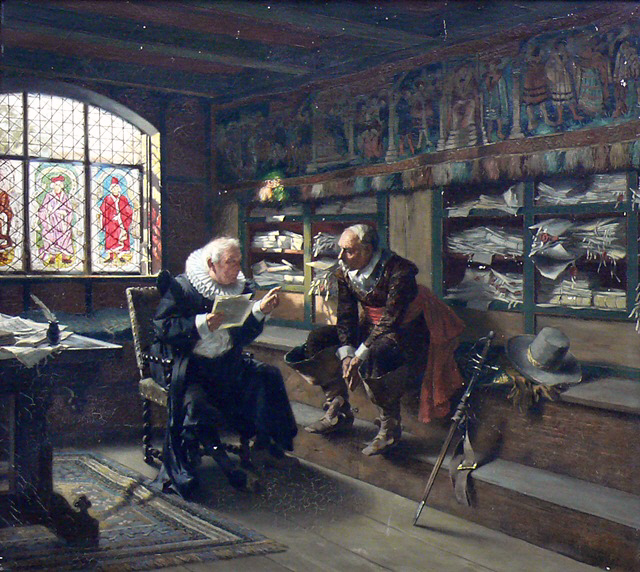
Notar by Max Volkhart

In Germany, the main function of a Notar (pl. Notare, fem. Notarin) is to draw up, execute, and retain legal instruments transacting or governing noncontentious matters in reserved areas of law:

- real property (conveyancing, servitudes, real securities)
- successions (wills and pacta successoria, estate planning, executorships)
- family law (marital agreements, healthcare proxies, alimony & child support agreements)
- company law (formation, restructuring, registration, corporate minutes)

Prospective notaries must have the same basic legal education as attorneys: first, they must be law graduates who have passed the first legal practice exam (erste juristische Staatsprüfung); then, they must article as a judicial clerk for 2 years and pass the second legal practice exam (zweite juristische Staatsprüfung). In addition, dual-practice notaries (Anwaltsnotar) must have 5 years standing as a practicing attorney/solicitor and pass a competitive notarial practice exam (notarielle Fachprüfung) before being admitted as notaries. Single-practice notaries (Nur-Notar), on the other hand, must article for 3 years as a trainee notary (Notarassessor). German notaries are appointed by authority of their state justice minister, draft notarial instruments (notarielle Urkunde) and retain them of record in their protocol (Urkundenrolle), and provide independent and impartial advice to all interested parties (Beteiligte). A notary's instruments are valid nationwide.

The mode of practice depends on the state, but in all, 1,700 German notaries practice exclusively as a notary versus 4,800 practicing dually as an attorney-notary. Notaries maintain independent private practices. Single-practice notaries practice as a notary sole (Einzelnotar) or in a 2-person partnership (Zweier-Sozietät), whereas attorney-notaries structure themselves into law firms of varying size.

German notaries prepare instruments according to federal statutory guidelines and advise appearers on their legal obligations and consequences. A notary's statutory duties are:

- to satisfy himself of the identity of the appearers (Erschienenen or Urkundsparteien);
- to verify the parties to contracts are competent to enter into them;
- Belehrungspflicht: to rigorously explain to appearers the contents and legal implications of the instrument; and
- to have the appearers sign before and with the notary and sometimes in the presence of witnesses.

The notary affixes his official seal (Dienstsiegel) to the instrument and binds it with thin cords (Verbindung, Heftung). If the instrument is prima facie duly executed, courts will enforce it, presume it valid and regular, and admit it as evidence to prove the truth of its contents.

In Germany, notaries are very important in day-to-day business. For example, any real estate sales contract (§ 311(b), German Civil Code), articles of association, alimony or child support agreement, or contract concerning succession (pactum successorium) must be in notarial form. Likewise, any share purchase or asset transfer agreement of a private limited company (GmbH) must be notarially executed pursuant to s. 15(3) of the Private Limited Companies Act (GmbHG). Contracts requiring notarial execution can be drafted by the executing notary, the parties, or by an attorney/solicitor.

== Indonesia ==
Every Indonesian notary (Indonesian: notaris, a professional directly copied from Dutch practice, is a member of the Indonesian Society of Notaries (Ikatan Notaris Indonesia, INI) and are very similar to his or her Dutch counterpart. However, agrarian reforms starting with the passing of the 1960 Land Act (itself replacing the Dutch East Indian Agrarische Wet of 1870, commonly referred to the act that started the Dutch East Indian liberal period) de jure removed real estate transactions from the notary's practice areas. All real estate transactions are now de jure executed by conveyancers (Indonesian: pejabat pembuat akta tanah, lit. 'land deed making officers', abbreviated as PPAT) appointed by the National Land Agency (in comparison, civil law notaries are appointed by the Ministry of Law and Human Rights), however most notaries often have dual-status as conveyancers.

== Italy ==
Notaries in Italy are professionals working in private-practice and paid on a fee-for-service basis, or, should they not earn enough money, by the national Notarial Trust (Cassa del Notariato), a public body funded by the notaries themselves, which also manages their pensions upon retirement.

In order to be admitted as a notary in Italy a candidate must pass a public exam open to all Italian citizens who:

- possess full citizenship rights and have not been convicted of any crimes;
- have successfully completed a university degree in law (laurea magistrale in giurisprudenza);
- have successfully completed an 18-month traineeship (articling) under a qualified notary (a notary who has served as such for more than 5 years);
- are less than 50 years of age;
- did not fail 5 previous attempts at the notary exam.

The public exam is composed of two parts, a written and an oral portion. The written portion consists of drafting three full notarial instruments (atto notarile), justifying the choices made in those instruments (spiegazione), and a theoretical part about the topics covered in the exam (parte teorica). The three tests are about the three most important areas of expertise of a notary: law of succession (mortis causa), contract law (inter vivos) and company law (diritto commerciale). Candidates achieving a sufficient score on the written test are admitted to the oral exam during which other subjects such as tax law are evaluated.

A national score report is published afterwards, and notaries admitted to practice are appointed to a certain practice area (city, rural area) based on their choices and their performance on the exam. After receiving their seal of office, which is the symbol of the profession and legitimizes the instruments they sign, a notary has to complete a final 6 months of training under a qualified notary.

Given the difficulty of the national exam, almost all candidates attend notary training institutes. Those schools are fully private institutions and are by no means mandatory, but virtually all successful candidates have at some point attended one or more.

An average person requires about 12 years (5 years of university, 18 months in a traineeship, an average of 5 years to pass the national exam and 6 further months of training) of continuous studies in order to become a notary. As such, notaries are among the most highly trained professionals in Italy and are held in high regard both professionally and socially.

After the training is done a notary usually opens a law office (studio notarile) in the practice area designated by the State. After one year they are allowed to open a second office in the same area. The law mandates a minimum of three half days to be allocated at the primary office but makes no references to a minimum or maximum fee that can be applied.

Given the relatively small number of notaries (about 5,000) and the high volume of work they are required to do, notaries are usually very expensive professionals, and consistently rank first among the best paid professional category in Italy.

Notaries are required by law whenever real estate (bene immobile) is donated, whenever a company changes its bylaws, or whenever relevant property (such as automobiles) is donated. Notarial instruments are legally binding, publicly available, and accorded full faith and credit for any claim until improbated (pubblica fede fino a prova di falso). The conclusive presumption of validity and regularity and public availability are the two main aspects of the notarial instrument as opposed to legal instruments drafted by attorneys or instruments drafted and signed by non-lawyers.

== Netherlands ==
Every Dutch civil law notary (Dutch: notaris) is part of the Royal Society of Notaries (Koninklijke Notariële Beroepsorganisatie (KNB, lit. 'Royal Professional Organization of Notaries', formerly the Royal Fraternity of Notaries (Koninklijke Notariële Broederschap) until 1 October 1997) and occupy a special position relative to other legal practitioners such as attorneys, court bailiffs, and tax advisors. This is apparent first and foremost from the fact that notaries are public officers appointed for life by the Crown and provide regulated legal services. As a qualified lawyer, a notary takes on clients, is paid on a fee-for-service basis. Life appointment is designed to safeguard the independence needed by notaries to discharge their functions.

Notaries are independent and disinterested. Unlike attorneys or legal advisors, a notary does not represent or act in the interest of any one party. Instead, under the Dutch legal system, notaries are required to act impartially on behalf of all parties to a contract or transaction. For example, when real property is conveyed, notaries act for both the seller and buyer, also as an escrow agent. They are subject to legal professional privilege and are therefore duty-bound not to betray client confidentiality, thereby giving them the right to withhold information in court as would an attorney or doctor. In cases where a notary acts as legal advisor to a particular interested party, the advising notary must counsel all parties including third-party beneficiaries.

All notaries are law graduates. Not only are they experts in family, estate, company, and property laws, but they must also stay up-to-date about pertinent cases and certain aspects of tax legislation. If necessary, a Dutch notary will instruct and call on the services of other legal practitioners. However, under no circumstances may a notary represent clients in court.

Apart from advising, a notary also draws, executes, and retains instruments either by statute or at the parties' request. Under Dutch law, a notarially executed instrument is probative as of the data certa (vaste datum) and subscription of the parties. Notaries archive the minute (protocol copy, Dutch minuut) and issue exemplifications (authentiek afschrift) to the parties. The only fully executed copy, known as the engrossment (grosse), is prima facie demonstrative evidence of its contents, similar to a court order. There is, therefore, no need for the party to or custodian of a notarial instrument to provide extraneous evidence to verify the instrument's probativity. And under Dutch law, for instruments to be self-executing they must be drawn up as public instruments, which is why any instrument drafted by a common-law lawyer, which is never public, is not self-executing in the Netherlands.

The new Notaries Act (Wet op het Notarisambt), commenced in October 1999 (156 years after the original act), reinforces the official position of notaries, but also expands on and adds to their traditional services. The consolidation of the notary's official position is, for example, reflected in the way the requirements of impartiality and independence have been enshrined in law, the many regulations a notary and notary's clerk are required to adhere to, and the fact that a notary is prohibited from acting as an attorney. Market forces have widened the possibility for notary's clerks to become notaries and for competition. However, the 1999 Act did not make substantial changes to the profession. While Dutch notaries are public officers and their instruments are public instruments, they are not government employees and instead act as independent private practitioners.

The new law makes it easier for notaries’ clerks to set up a practice and gives notaries more freedom in determining their fees for services. The Act has provided for the establishment of an external committee of experts; if notary's clerks submit a sound business plan to the committee, they have a greater chance to be approved to set up their own practice. Greater freedom in the fees a notary can charge implies that the Royal Society of Notaries no longer fixes fees or prescribes rates. Since July 2003 notaries have been free to establish their own fees. Maximum rate caps fixed by authorities now apply only to family law services in certain circumstances.

== Quebec (Canada) ==
A Quebec notary, or notaire, is a highly specialized lawyer in private practice appointed as a public officer that takes part in the administration of justice. A notary is also a legal adviser.

The mission of notaries, in their capacity as a public officer, is to execute acts which the parties wish or are required to endow with the authenticity attaching to acts of public authority, to provide such acts with a fixed date, and to keep all acts executed en minute in their notarial records and issue copies of or extracts from them.

In their role as a public officer, notaries are duty-bound to act impartially and to advise all parties to an act which the parties wish or are required to endow with authenticity.

Notaries have a monopoly on marital property systems, estate administration, and conveyancing (realty sales, mortgages, etc.) and give legal advices regarding noncontentious matters.

Studies

- Notaries earn undergraduate law degrees (Baccalauréat en droit (LL.B.) or Licence en droit (LL.L.)) from an accredited Canadian Civil Law school.
- Law graduates must then earn a master's degree in notarial law (LL.M.) (Maîtrise en droit notarial) which specialized in contract laws, advanced tax law, business law, conflict of laws, real estate law, city planning and environmental law, dispute prevention and resolution, and estate planning. To graduate, students must complete 54 postgraduate credits, which include an 80-day internship and practice seminars.
- LL.M. graduates must then enroll at the notary institute (Chambre des notaires du Québec) and pass professional exams. Notaries are also required to attend regular continuing education courses and seminars.

== Spain ==
In Spain, a notario is both a civil servant and a private and highly specialised lawyer. Thus, although they hold a private practice, depending on the role they professionally exercise they may be acting as public officers (for instance, when working with governmental agencies and departments, or when certifying notarial instruments in a court of law) or as private practitioners (for instance, when paying their own staff's taxes and salaries, or assuming the running costs of their own notarial practice). Spanish notaries are charged with writing and authorising notarial instruments that gather either perceptible facts from which some legal right might be derived (for instance, holding witness, or validating a document), or juridical business of any sort both in private and commercial law that in one way or another require collecting the will of all parties involved, as would be for instance mortgage contracts or powers of attorney (poder notarial).

Notaries are regulated by the Ley de 28 de mayo de 1862 del Notariado de España (Spanish Notaries Act 1862). Access to the profession is restricted to Spanish and EU citizens over the age of 23, and who hold a law graduate degrees (or, rarely, a doctorate in law). In order to become a notary, the candidate has to sit a highly competitive public examination consisting of 4 parts covering all legal and practical aspects of Spanish private law. This oposición pública is usually called once a year to cover arising vacancies in the notarial jurisdictions. Because very few openings take place, the success rate for this exam is extremely low (under 1% earn a position), and preparing for the examination typically takes potential candidates 2 to 5 years.

Spanish notaries exercise their notarial instruments (known in general as fe pública notarial) in a dual manner:

1. When discussing matters of fact, what a Spanish notary sees, hears, or perceives is held to have full evidentiary value and executory force, and is, therefore, proof of the fact.
2. When discussing matters of the Law, notarial instruments hold the authenticity and probative force of the wills declared by the parties appearing in it.

As private practitioners, Spanish notaries are also obliged by law to offer legal counsel to all those that may require or demand it, and advise them on the most appropriate legal means they may need to reach their goals, so long as the latter are licit.

Unlike in common law jurisdictions, Spanish notaries are actively involved in drafting the notarial instruments and contracts, usually (if so needed) as advised by the signing parties. In that manner, they act as private practitioners. However, inasmuch as public officers, notaries are obliged to ensure that the notarial instruments and contracts are law abiding, and upon notarising the instrument (calificación notarial), the instrument has the full power of the law. Because of this, the validity and truthfulness of notarial instruments are a priori held to be true, and therefore had probative value in the Courts, were disputes to arise.

The three main notarial instruments a Spanish notary holds are:

1. Escrituras públicas (public-form instruments), which refer to all contracts and declarations that involve the assent of two or more parties. This includes house deeds,
2. Actas notariales (private-form instruments). These are notarial statements, whereby the notary bears witness to something he or she has physically been part of. They may be employed by lawyers requiring an independent third party (the notary) to witness something (the presence of some individual somewhere, or the drawing of a specific prize by lot, the validity of a translation...).
3. Pólizas intervenidas (intervened policies). These are typically commercial contracts such as mortgage and insurance policies, where one of the parties grants some right (say, a loan) to another.

Finally, Spanish notaries offer engrossments and certifications, e.g. copy certifications. Notaries execute and stamp ‘dar fe’ (giving faith) on each page of the notarial instrument, which are bound together with their archival number and page, and held in a protocol (practice). The notarial instrument is always written on certified paper (papel timbrado), special paper issued and numbered by the Royal Mint, and bound alongside all other notarial instruments yearly to be archived by the notary's protocol. The minute copy (matriz) must be physically held by the notary. The notary may issue exemplified copies of the minute having the same validity as the latter.

Notarial practices are limited by law to a specific practice location where the notary typically has his or her law office (notaría). Each notary's office is held by a notary sole, and tends to employ a number of clerks (pasantes) and administrators. These offices are private practices, and are self-funded with the fees that the notary is allowed to charge. Notaries' fees are regulated by law. Each notarial instrument has a moderate cost on its own, added to which the notary charges per page drafted, per copy emitted, etc., a legally set amount. The notary is also obliged to collect whichever taxes may be involved in the transactions they notarise (for instance, the stamp duty or VAT costs).

=== Latin America ===
Although regulated in a different manner in each country, notaries in the Spanish Americas operate in a very similar manner to Spanish notaries.

== Other countries ==
As a general rule, countries who formerly were colonies or viceroyalties of Spain, France or Portugal, have retained a civil law tradition and, accordingly, a civil-law notarial profession. This is the case with most Latin American and French-speaking African countries, but not so of Asian countries.

=== The International Union of Notaries ===
Most of the countries which have civil-law notaries are members of the International Union of Notaries (UINL). Members include:

Europe (35)
Albania, Andorra, Armenia, Austria, Belarus, Belgium, Bosnia and Herzegovina, Bulgaria, Croatia, the Czech Republic, Estonia, France, Germany, Greece, Hungary, Italy, Latvia, Lithuania, the United Kingdom (only the City of London), Luxembourg, Malta, Moldova, Monaco, The Netherlands, Poland, Portugal, Romania, Russia, San Marino, Slovakia, Slovenia, Spain, Switzerland, Macedonia, The Vatican, Turkey and Ukraine.
Americas (24)
Argentina, Bolivia, Brazil, Chile, Colombia, Costa Rica, Cuba, Dominican Republic, El Salvador, Ecuador, Guatemala, Haiti, Honduras, Mexico, Nicaragua, Panama, Paraguay, Peru, Puerto Rico (United States), Louisiana (United States), Quebec (Canada), Uruguay, and Venezuela.
Africa (15)
Algeria, Benin, Burkina Faso, Cameroon, the Central African Republic, Chad, Congo, Gabon, Guinea, Côte d'Ivoire, Mali, Morocco, Niger, Senegal and Togo.
Asia (3)
Bangladesh, China (People's Republic), Indonesia, Japan.

The members of the union are represented by their respective national councils or by similar national organisations and by notarial districts and regional or provincial societies of notaries.

The UINL has preferential relations with professional legal officers who fulfil notarial duties in various countries (or federated states within a federation) or with the bodies that represent them.

The countries that have asked to join the union are: Georgia, Mauritius, Kazakhstan, Mauritania, Belarus, Bosnia-Herzegovina, Cambodia, Iran, Kyrgyzstan, Laos, Madagascar, New Zealand, the Philippines, Serbia, the Seychelles, South Korea, Tunisia, and Vietnam.

The federated states that have asked to join the union are: Alabama, British Columbia, Florida, Illinois, Indiana, and Texas.

== History ==
=== Origins ===
Scribes have existed since recorded history, but the notary's authentication tools were first invented in the Fertile Crescent where in Babylon the use of signatures and distinct signs in clay tablets was required. Egypt innovated the use of papyrus and the calame, added legalistic formalism to document preparation, and had specialized notary-scribes, called sesh n pero' "pharaoh's scribe" or sesh n po "scribe of the nome"—agoranomos in Ptolemaic times—who gave authenticity to instruments without the need for witnesses. In Ancient Israel there existed a similar institution of the notary-scribe known as the sofér. Greek city-states lacked uniformity, but, universally, public instruments, usually deeds and conveyances, were kept in official registers and drafted by scribal mnemone (or basiliki ipographi "king's scribes") who were tied to a certain district and whose written acts trumped oral testimony. These innovations would be combined and adopted under the Roman Empire.

=== Roman Empire ===
In Rome, scribes (scribae) acted as court recorders and copyists of instruments, whereas the notarius took dictation and raw minutes or memoranda (notae) of proceedings in shorthand. Different kinds of notarius existed: some recorded proceedings, others transcribed state papers, some supplied magistrates with legal forms, and others registered judgements and decrees. A number were involved with the noncontentious jurisdiction of the courts by drawing up deeds, wills, and conveyances which could then be sealed before the presiding magistrate and affixed with the official seal of the court, thereby rendering them public and probative acts. Otherwise, most instruments were in private form. One type of notarius was the exceptor who emerged as the official clerk attached to all bureaus and courts and required at all municipal meetings of curiae.

Yet, drawing up private documents was more the preserve of the tabellio, a professional scrivener who held no public office. The tabellio used clerks to take shorthand notes and wrote them out in minute form. This was then engrossed into an extended act, duly attested by witnesses and endorsed with a completio, or eschatocol (docquet). Early on and like the notarius, a tabellio's instrument lacked probativity. Only by attaching copies of the judicial proceedings wherein one party petitions the second party to either contest or accept the act in open court could the instrument be made probative, i.e., imbued with fides publica, "public faith and credit". In later years, it became possible to register and deposit the acts of a tabellio in public archives to make them probative. Both exceptores and tabelliones were organized into civil guilds (collegia, scholae) to ensure the official recording of both public and private acts. Though tabelliones were of lower social status, the position had high mobility, and official posts often drew young nobles.

By the Late Roman period, notarius came to denote registrars attached to the courts of provincial governors, secretaries of emperors, and the highest class of officials in the privy council and the imperial chancery. In the Church, they were administrative secretaries for bishops and monasteries and were important as correspondents in the doctrinal battles of the 3rd and 4th centuries. Constantine himself created guilds of notarii for bishops and their courts. Tabelliones were nicknamed "runners" (cursores) because of their quick drafting speed and their "cursive" minute hand. They were also sometimes known as forenses and publici—from their presence in public places—before being subsumed under the functions of the tabulairus, or notary-clerk. Lawyers—or juris prudense or juris consulte—also often acted as scriveners.

=== Early Middle Ages ===
With the degeneration of public administration and its assumption by the Church in the West, as well as the replacement of Roman legal writing culture with a Germanic oral legal system based on witness testimony and open court proceedings, secular scribes and scriveners became obsolete. In a select group of urban areas, such as in northern Italy and southern France, Roman law tended to be preserved, at least for civil matters, and there the secular notarius or tabellio lived on mostly as a scrivener. Ecclesiastical notaries (notarius ecclesiaie) in the main perfected a number of common notarial devices, namely the use of ribbons, seals, manual signs (signum), and the form of the eschatocol during this time. They also came to be called scrinarius. Pope Gregory the Great (r. 590–604) organized papal notarii or scrinarii into a schola; Gregory's registers show that they were responsible for recording correspondence, ordinations, privileges, donations, synodal acts, and matters related to the Patrimony of Saint Peter, as well as serving as papal advisors, diplomats, and envoys. Similarly, the papal chancery, archive, and library were organized around their efforts.

In northern Italy during the Ostrogothic and Lombard periods, the offices of exceptor and tabellio were carried out by scriptores and notaries. The notarius civitatis, or ‘urban notary’, served Lombard kings and nobles in their courts; notarii ecclesiae continued to aid bishops, abbots, and some of the public. These two kinds of notaries attended the same episcopal schools, and the existence of ecclesiastical notaries led to the demand for secular ones. Unorganized and unregulated publici notarii, or ‘lay notaries’, handled private matters, since the Lombards did not practice insinuation. From the late 7th century on, important notaries’ societies (and probably notarial education) existed in Pavia, Cremona, Milan, Lucca, Rome, and Ravenna.

In Merovingian France, ecclesiastical notaries, continuing Late Imperial practice, were attached to county courts as clerks of court who recorded proceedings and prepared and engrossed instruments and process which were later sealed before the count with the court's official seal to render them public and authentic. Otherwise, it was not until the 9th century, when Charlemagne, in an effort to reform the county court system, began to appoint notaries to accompany itinerant royal commissioners during their assize circuit, which notaries were called royal notaries. By the 10th century, they had become permanent clerks of court and came to greatly outnumber and then absorb the comital notaries into their corps. This system was preserved by the Holy Roman Empire.

Charlemagne also raised ecclesiastical notaries to the status of deacon or priest. As a result, the Office of notary became a stepping-stone to higher church office. They continued to serve the public as well before being made obsolete by the full emergence of a lay notarial profession in the 12th century. Charlemagne ordered that every bishop, abbot, and count employ a notary, appointed by himself if necessary. He therefore accepted and altered Lombard practice, formalized it, and spread it to the rest of the empire. His own notarial secretaries were the cancellarii. One notary in particular, Paul the Deacon, played a pivotal role in the Carolingian Renaissance. Paul was trained at Pavia, was chancellor to the Lombard king Desierius, taught at the Frankish palace school (782–787), and may have been responsible for reforming the notarial system. The famous missi dominici oversaw the work of comital (counts') and episcopal notaries, who, under Louis the Pious, were drawn specifically from the noble class. Under Lothair I, imperial law regulated notarial practice of both episcopal and comital cancellarii and private notaries and limited a notary's geographic jurisdiction.

=== Byzantine Europe ===
In the East, however, the tabularius, called symbolaiographos and the juris, the nomikos, continued to thrive. To stem fraud, Justinian reforms codified (cf. 44th and 77th novellae) new precautionary measures for giving a document probativity such as:

- the actual presence of the attesting tabellio and the recording of other witnesses' names,
- the obligatory presence and signatures of witnesses to an act's signing
- dating by regnal and consular year and indiction
- inclusion of an eschatocol in which the tabellio claimed responsibility for the document
- recitation before a judge before recordation, a process known as insinuatio.

Some measures proved untenable and, with the short supply of administrators and half loss of the Empire (early 7th century), notaries became a primarily urban phenomenon with somewhat relaxed standards of practice. Still, they remained the highest-ranking lawyer and instrumental to the legal and court process as Germanic-type oral proceedings were unknown and Roman legalistic traditions survived intact. From the mid-6th century, a large body of centuries-old legal texts was given force of law and became widely circulated. Similarly, the importance of law court officials declined as did lawsuits in regular civil courts and this, in turn, allowed private settlements mediated by notaries at lower cost to flourish.

In time, all notarial functions (clerical and law officer) were concentrated into the law-trained nomikos, though the Church would provide notarial services in town and rural settings. The Church also retained the old separation between symbolaiographos, or notary-draftsman, notarios, or notary-scribe, and the clerical nomikos, or notary lawyer. By the 10th century, secular nomikoi had been organized into a regulatory guild, were attached to the State, appointed by the Emperor, and ranked among the highest of legal officers. The introductory portions of their acts also tended to invoke God, and crosses and Christian insignia were often applied to the face of an act. Notarial practice would be slightly westernized under Venetian occupation, but remained substantially unchanged until the end of the Empire.

=== Late Middle Ages ===
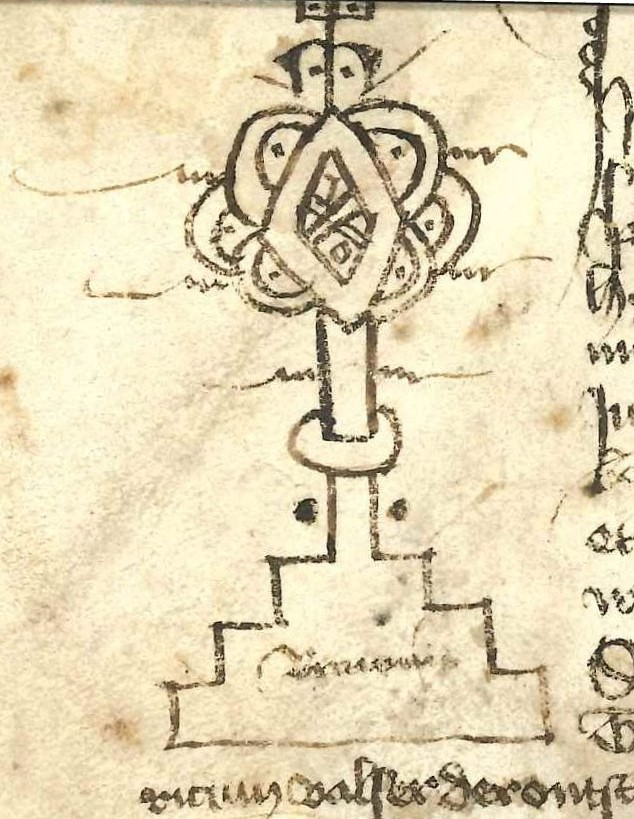
The sign of the late medieval public notary Hans Braun from Bamberg, operating in Bolzano in 1429

Imperial Ravenna retained separate scholae of imperial notaries, ecclesiastical notaries, and tabelliones. However, with the fall of the Exarchate, imperial notaries disappeared with unauthorized tabelliones absorbing most of their legal jurisdiction and function. During the 11th century and the early 12th century, attempts to bring the tabellionate under imperial purview were resisted and failed at Ravenna, though by the 13th century many professionals styled themselves notarius et tabellio, combining both functions in their practice. By the 13th century, even the Ravennati adopted the title "notary by imperial authority," and the retrograde tabellionate slowly dissolved. The ecclesiastical notariate in Ravenna retained its position until the 12th century, but did not interfere in the sphere of the secular notariate. During the 12th century, the lay tabellionate absorbed most of the functions of the church notary, even running Ravenna's episcopal chancery by 1127. Elsewhere in Italy, where it had survived, the independent ecclesiastical notariate likewise slowly disappeared: in Lucca, the comital notariate replaced it during the Carolingian period; and in Bologna, home of the revived imperial legal tradition, the bishop's last clerical notary died in 1133. Even in Rome, lay notaries gained in importance, and in 1211 Pope Innocent III declared that no notary in a church court could hold major orders.

In southern Italy, when Sicily fell to the Arabs it lost the notarial tradition, while other areas, such as Apulia, Calabria, and Lucania, held on to Greco-Byzantine practices. Areas retaining the Latin-Lombard traditions used the notarius, but he may have been attached to and authorized through a palace, church, monastery, or even city; or sometimes he was itinerant and without official authority. During the 10th century, Naples maintained a clear organization of notaries (curiali) in a collegio under a primarius aided by a tabularius. Documents were often drawn up by discipuli ("apprentices"), but only the notary could apply the eschatocol. Amalfi followed a looser organization: scribae civitatis ("scriveners") were called curiali by c. 1000, many may have worked only part-time, and there was no clear caste of discipuli. Gaeta retained the scriba civitatis, though mixing Greek with Latin traditions and clerical with secular functions and statuses. In the 10th and 11th centuries, titles included presbyter ("priest") et notarius civitatis and Leo greco-latinus presbyter et scriba civitatis, though by the early 12th century a simple notarius civitatis would do. The southern Italian tradition was for the most part replaced by the Carolingian tradition when the region was conquered by the Normans.

As northern Italy came to free itself in the late 11th century from imperial rule and episcopal authority, it established municipal authorities (known as consulates) who, with the increase in literacy, came to rely heavily on the lay notary to produce, archive, and standardize public instruments under municipal seal. In addition, the Venetian pillaging of Byzantine libraries revived bookish learning and led to the founding of law schools, such as at the University of Bologna which trained notaries-at-law. Similarly, as schools for notaries relied on Byzantine law and came to determine the development of the notarial corps, by the 10th century, the Carolingian and the Byzantine traditions were no longer distinguishable. The Italian notarial profession was transmitted from Lombardy to southern France through trade, first to Languedoc, and eventually northward to Bruges (Flemish Belgium), and on to the eastern Mediterranean.

== Distinction from notaries public in Canada and the United States ==
Save for Louisiana, Puerto Rico, and Quebec, a civil-law notary should not be confused with a notary public in the United States and Canada, who has none of the legal powers notaries enjoy at civil law. Rather, notaries public only have the power to administer oaths, take affidavits, declarations or depositions from witnesses, acknowledge and attest signatures, and certify copies, usually in conjunction with some legal process.

The same does not apply to notaries public in the United Kingdom, Australia, New Zealand and many other common law countries. There the notary public is a lawyer and often holds a secondary legal qualification, such as solicitor or barrister. The aspiring notary public usually has to take additional exams or undertake post graduate study to become a notary public.

In Louisiana, Puerto Rico, and Quebec, private law is traditionally based on the French and Spanish civil codes, giving notaries greater legal powers, including the right to prepare wills, conveyances and generally all contracts and instruments in writing. For this reason, immigrants from civil-law countries where civil-law notaries exist, particularly those from Latin America, are often confused by the office of notary public and have been defrauded by dishonest notaries misrepresenting themselves as having legal powers. Thus, in some states, there have been ongoing efforts to prohibit notaries public from listing themselves as notario público. Such a law has existed for more than fifteen years in California. Similar laws now exist in Colorado, Florida, Georgia, Illinois, Tennessee and Texas.

Florida (1997) and Alabama (1999) have enacted statutes and regulations, based on the Model Civil Law Notary Act, allowing for the appointment of Florida or Alabama attorneys as civil law notaries with the power to authenticate documents, facts and transactions. This is not the same as a notary public appointment. Attorneys with a minimum of 5 years of bar membership are appointed after specialized training and state examination. Acts of Florida and Alabama civil law notaries are given both domestic and international effect under their enabling statutes. A civil law notary statute was proposed in Illinois in 2002, but was not enacted into law.

== See also ==
- Notary
- Notary public
- Solicitor
