= Certified copy =

Verified copy of a primary document

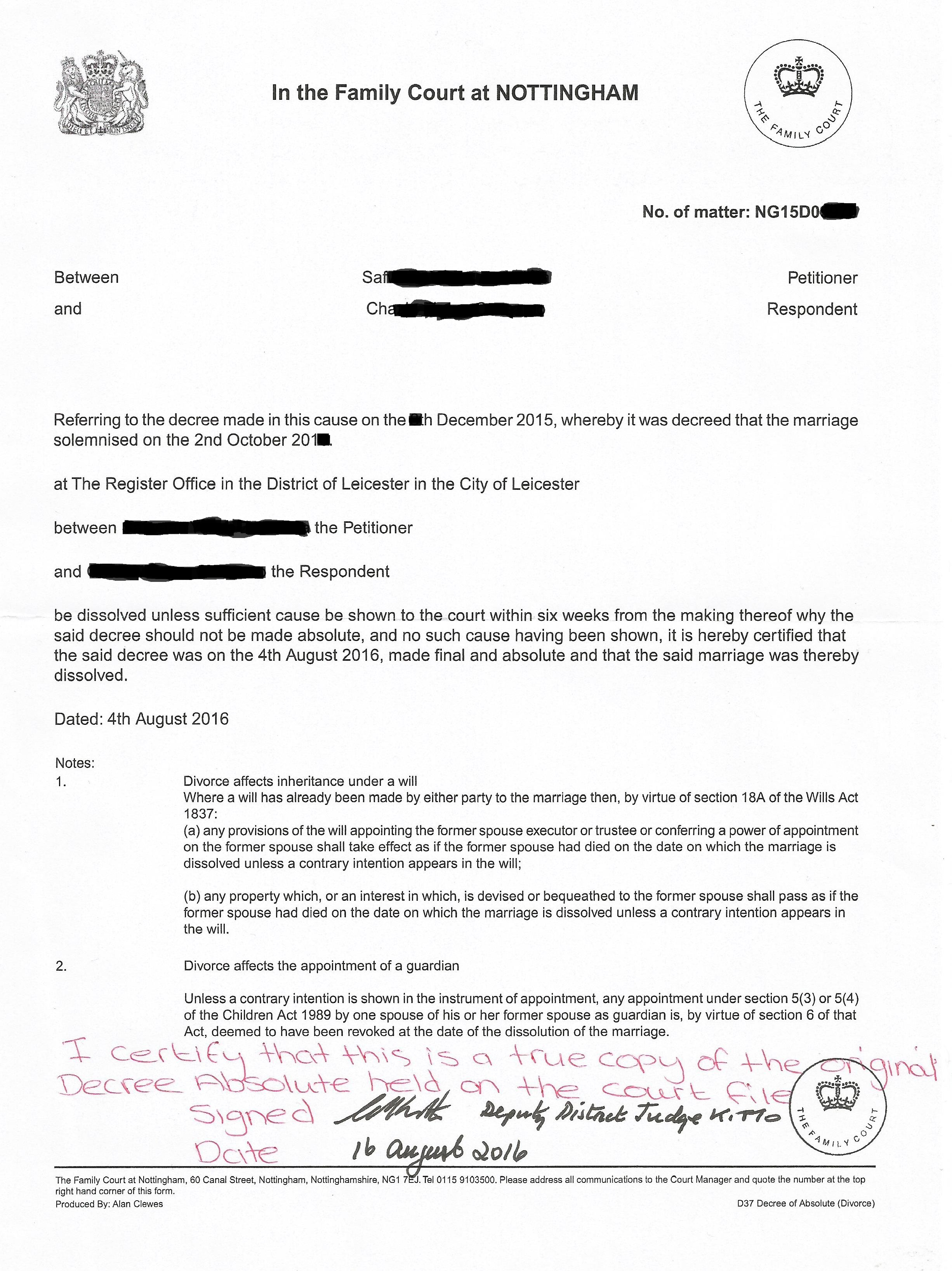
Exemplified certified copy of Decree Absolute issued by the Family Court Deputy District Judge – divorce certificate

A certified copy is a copy (often a photocopy) of a primary document that has on it an endorsement or certificate that it is a true copy of the primary document. It does not certify that the primary document is genuine, only that it is a true copy of the primary document.

A certified copy is often used in English-speaking common law countries as a convenient way of providing a copy of documents. It is usually inexpensive to obtain. A certified copy may be required for official government or court purposes and for commercial purposes. It avoids the owner of important documents (especially identity documents) giving up possession of those documents which might mean a risk of their loss or damage.

It has some similarities to a notarized copy, which is a form used in some countries, and particularly in some US states. A notarized copy is signed by a notary public (not to be confused with a notary in a civil law country).

The certified copy is signed by a person nominated by the person or agency asking for it. Typically, the person is referred to as an authorised person. The person who is authorised to sign the certificate will vary between countries. Sometimes a person is authorised by legislation to do so (for example a court clerk, solicitor, or notary public), but this is not always so. In some countries, for example the United Kingdom and South Africa, identity documents can also be certified by authorised post office staff.

A copy of a primary document that is to be used internationally may have to be in the form of a notarized copy rather than a certified copy. A notarized copy may be more expensive to obtain. A copy of a document to be used internationally may also have to comply with special rules - Hague Convention Abolishing the Requirement of Legalisation for Foreign Public Documents.

If the primary document needs to be translated, an additional certificate is usually required. Typically, the document must be translated professionally and have the professional's certificate of accuracy attached to the translation together with a copy of the primary document. Then, the primary document, the translation, and the certificate of accuracy are photocopied in the form of a certified copy. For example, a Russian birth certificate used in an English-speaking country, a notarized copy will be required.

== Australia ==
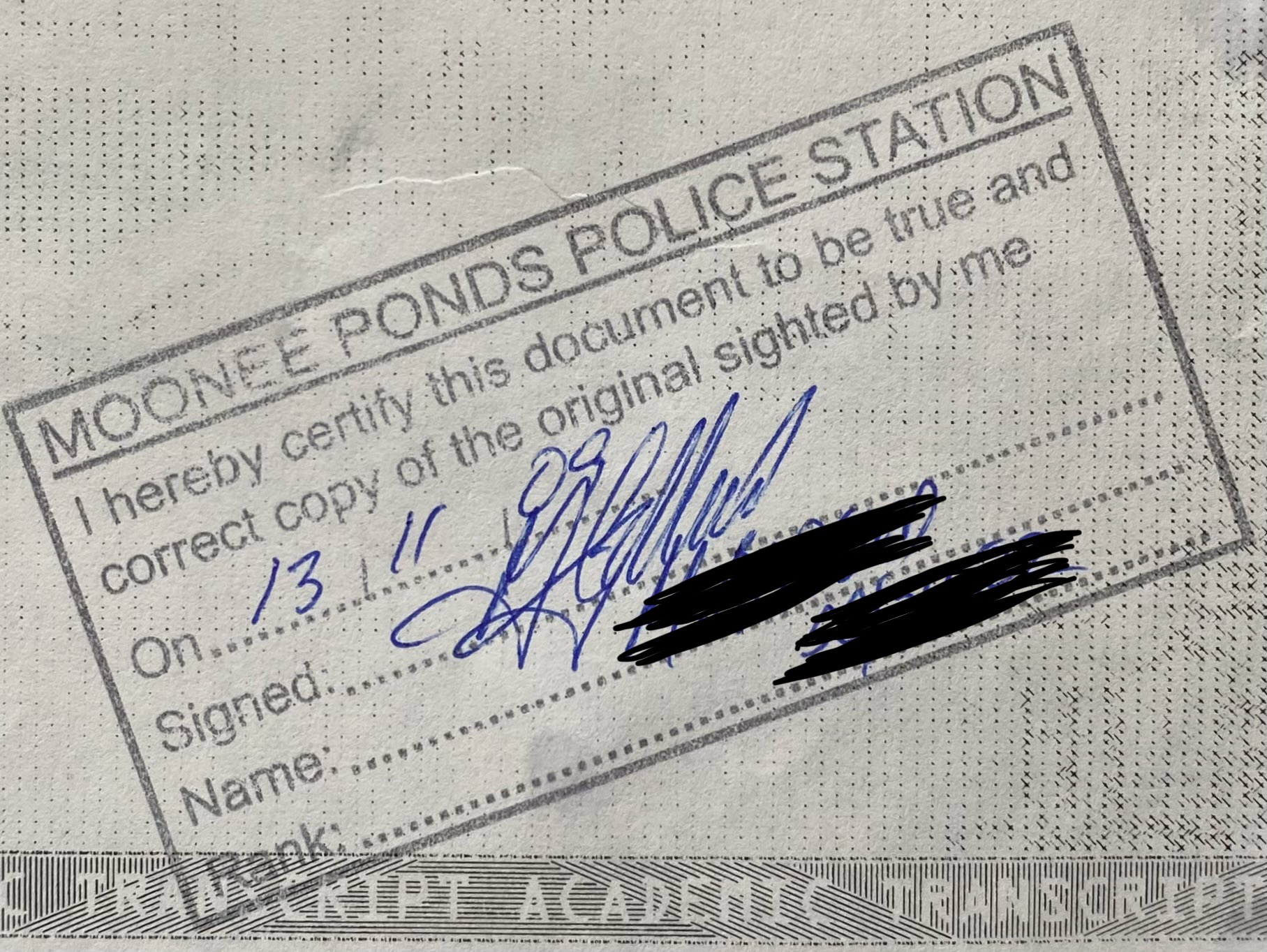
Certification stamp on a photocopy of an academic transcript in Australia

In Australia, certified copies are largely the creation of administrative practice. Some Commonwealth and State legislation do require the use of certified copies or state classes of people who can lawfully certify a copy of a document in some situations.

Certified copies have long been used to confirm the authenticity of a photocopy of a primary document. In practice, they are very easy to obtain at almost no cost other than the photocopy, and are used in a wide range of situations, especially with identity documents.

In practice, and purely for convenience, a copy may usually be certified by a person who is able to witness a statutory declaration under federal legislation about Statutory Declarations. A person who has been admitted as an Australian lawyer by the Supreme Court of a State or Territory can witness a statutory declaration, whether or not they hold a practising certificate. Other categories of people listed in Schedule 1 of the Regulations may also witness a statutory declaration. Part 1 of schedule 1 states that chiropractors, dentists, legal practitioners, medical practitioners, nurses, optometrists, patent attorneys, pharmacists, physiotherapists, psychologists, trade mark attorneys and Veterinary surgeons may certify copies. Part 2 of the schedule lists various other professions and positions, the members or occupants of which may also certify copies (for example, judges, police officers and members of parliament).

A typical certificate endorsed on the photocopy, often typed or stamped except for the signature:

CERTIFIED TRUE COPY OF THE ORIGINAL

I certify that this is a true copy of the original document.

Signed:
Dated:
Authority to sign:
Telephone number:

Certified copies can be quite basic in Australia due to the lack of legislation. More detail is often required by the person or agency requiring it. Sometimes the person or agency will contact the person certifying the copy to limit the possibility of a fraudulent copy.

In some states and territories, police stations and libraries have arrangements to enable documents to be certified or witnessed by a justice of the peace at no cost.

== Botswana ==
Photocopies can be certified free at a police station. Certified copies, for example of the "Omang" state identity card, are widely used, and are often required for job applications, etc.

== Hong Kong SAR ==
The Companies Ordinance, section 775 sets out categories of people who can certify a copy of a document for part 16 (Non-Hong Kong Companies). The categories include notaries public, solicitors, members of the Hong Kong Institute of Certified Public Accountants and members of the Hong Kong Chartered Governance Institute.

The same categories of people may also certify, for the Ordinance, a translation into English or Chinese from another language.

== India ==
In India, under section 2(j)(ii) of The Right to Information Act, 2005, the Public Information Officer (PIO) is mandatorily 'required to provide the appellant "Certified copies of documents or records."' In such a case, the PIO is only certifying that copies of documents or records are true copies of those held on a 'X' page of a 'X' file of the Public Authority, irrespective of their original source.

== Sri Lanka ==
In Sri Lanka, certified copy or true copy of an original document can be attested by an attorney, a notary public or a justice of the peace.

== United States ==
Certified copies of public records, such as birth and marriage certificates, must be obtained from the office that holds the record.

In most U.S. states and territories, notaries public are authorized to certify copies of any documents that are not public records. For example, they may certify copies of passports, identification cards, driver licenses, statements and contracts. In this case, the notary signs a statement directly certifying that the copy is true. In other states, notaries are not authorized to certify copies, or may certify copies of only a few types of documents such as their own notary journals. In case the notary is not authorized to certify a copy, it is possible to perform an alternative procedure, known as "copy certification by document custodian", where the holder of the document signs a statement affirming that the copy is true, and the notary only certifies that the holder signed and affirmed this statement.

To certify that the copy is true, some states require that the notary personally make or supervise the photocopying process, while others allow the notary to visually compare a copy presented by the requester to the original document.

Jurisdiction	Documents whose copies may be certified by notaries (other than public records)	Photocopy must be made or supervised by the notary
Alabama	Notary's journal	No
Alaska	None	—N/a
American Samoa	Any	Yes
Arizona	Any	Yes
Arkansas	Any	Yes
California	Powers of attorney and notary's journal	No
Colorado	Any	No
Connecticut	Any	Yes
Delaware	Any	No
District of Columbia	Any	No
Florida	Any	Yes
Georgia	Any	Yes
Guam	Any	No
Hawaii	Protests and notary's journal	No
Idaho	Any	Yes
Illinois	None	—N/a
Indiana	Any	Yes
Iowa	Any	Yes
Kansas	Any	No
Kentucky	Any	No
Louisiana	Acts passed by the same notary and their attachments	No
Maine	Any	No
Maryland	Any	No
Massachusetts	Any	Yes
Michigan	None	—N/a
Minnesota	Any	No
Mississippi	None	—N/a
Missouri	Any	No
Montana	Any	No
Nebraska	None	—N/a
Nevada	Any	Yes
New Hampshire	Any	No
New Jersey	Any	No
New Mexico	Any	Yes
New York	None	—N/a
North Carolina	None	—N/a
North Dakota	Any	No
Northern Mariana Islands	Any	No
Ohio	None	—N/a
Oklahoma	Any	No
Oregon	Any	Yes
Pennsylvania	Any	No
Puerto Rico	Any	No
Rhode Island	Any	Yes
South Carolina	None	—N/a
South Dakota	None	—N/a
Tennessee	None	—N/a
Texas	Any	No
United States Virgin Islands	Any	No
Utah	Any	No
Vermont	Any	No
Virginia	Any	Yes
Washington	Any	No
West Virginia	Any	No
Wisconsin	Any	No
Wyoming	Any	No

Example of copy certification by notary:

State of ________________, County of ________________

I certify that this is a true and correct copy of a record in the possession of _______________________________.
Dated _______________________________

_______________________________
(Notary Public)
(Notarial stamp, including name, title, and commission expiration)

Example of copy certification by document custodian:

I, _______________________________, hereby declare that the attached reproduction of _______________________________ is a true and correct copy of the original document.

_______________________________
(Document custodian)

State of ________________, County of ________________

Signed and sworn to (or affirmed) before me on _______________________________ by _______________________________.

_______________________________
(Notary Public)
(Notarial stamp, including name, title, and commission expiration)

== Vietnam ==
In Vietnam, a certified copy or true copy of an original document can be attested by a Ward/District or higher People's Committee or Notary Office, not only Vietnamese official documents but also foreign documents.

== See also ==
- Exemplified copy
