= At large =

At large may refer to:

- At-large, a political system where officials are elected to represent the entire governed region, rather than on a district basis
- At Large (album), a 1959 album by The Kingston Trio
- At large (fugitive), a classification for a fugitive on the run
- At-large bid, a sports term for a bid or berth granted by invitation
- Time at large, a legal principle relating to a contract with no valid timescale applicable to its completion
