= Schmidt v Holland =

Legal Case

- Court: High Court of New Zealand
- Full case name: Schmidt v Holland
- Decided: 20 December 1982
- Citation: [1982] 2 NZLR 406

Court membership
- Judge sitting: Hardie Boys J

Schmidt v Holland [1982] 2 NZLR 406 is a cited case in New Zealand regarding the issue of notice of cancellation of a contract, where a contract has been breached.

== Background ==
The Schmidts agreed to purchase the Holland's property. Later, the Schmidt's decided to buy someone else's property, and as a result the Schmidt's indicated to the Hollands, that they did not plan to purchase their property.

As a consequence, the Holland's treated their sales contract as being cancelled, and later sold their property to a 3rd party, and sued the Schmidts for the loss in the resale.

The Schmidts disputed liability, on the basis that as the Hollands had not actioned the formality of informing them that they had accepted their repudiation of the contract, they could not treat the contract as legally cancelled.

== Decision ==
The High Court of New Zealand ruled that as the Schmidt's were not formally advised by the Holland's that they had cancelled the contract, they were not liable for the loss on resale. At the same time, a sympathetic Hardie Boys J stated "The result is hard on the Hollands, for they were not at fault, and their position could so easily have been protected".

Footnote: The courts have subsequently shown willingness to avoid such rulings, such as in Chatfield v Jones (1990) 3 NZLR 285
