= M/S R.M.D.C. (Mysore) v. State of Mysore =

Supreme Court judgment

M/S R.M.D.C (Mysore) Private Ltd. v. State of Mysore
- Court: Supreme Court of India
- Full case name: M/S R.M.D.C (Mysore) Private Ltd. v. State of Mysore
- Decided: 1961
- Citation: AIR 1962 SC 594

M/S R.M.D.C (Mysore) v. State of Mysore, (AIR 1962 SC 594) was a judgment of the Supreme Court of India, dealing with constitutional law, where the Court utilized the doctrine of colourable legislation. This is a landmark case on Centre-States relations in India, and was decided in favor of the erstwhile State of Mysore. This case dealt with issues of conflict between the States and Union regarding legislative competence. It further held that surrender of legislative competence by a state to the Union under article 252(2) of the Indian Constitution does not amount to surrender of powers of taxation.

== Background and Facts ==
The appellants, M/S R.M.D.C., were conducting their business in Mysore, since August, 1948, under the head of "prize competitions". They were governed by the Mysore Lotteries and Prize Competitions Control and Tax Act, 1951. Following an appeal from various states to the Union under article 252 of the Indian Constitution, a Central Legislation was passed called the Prize Competitions Act, 1955. The State of Mysore, among other states, adopted this act, thereby assenting to the Union's exclusive jurisdiction over control of prize competitions. However, it later passed an ordinance amending certain provisions of the act to deem taxation powers upon themselves. This was called into question by the R.M.D.C. as being ultra vires the legislative competence of the State. It was also contended that the doctrine of colourable legislation was applicable, as the State of Mysore was attempting to control the conduct of prize competitions indirectly, by appropriating the powers of their taxation.

== Arguments ==
=== Appellant ===
Porus A. Mehta, J. R. Gagrat and G. Gopalakrishnan, who were the counsel for the appellants, made 5 major arguments. Their first contention was that the Mysore Legislature, by adopting the Central legislation, had surrendered their competence to legislate on any matter regarding prize competitions. They stated that all powers, including that of taxation, had been surrendered in favour of the Parliament. The competency to enact laws with regard to Entry 34 and 62 of List II of the Seventh Schedule were contended to have been surrendered. The former entry dealt with "betting and gambling" while the latter regarded "taxation of luxuries, including betting and gambling". Secondly, they contended that even if it was held that all powers had not been surrendered, the amendments made to the act were in violation of article 252(2), as it indirectly amends the Central legislation by adding a new method of control by imposition of penalties of a monetary nature. Thirdly, they stated that the Mysore Legislature could not amend an act that stood repealed as a result of the enactment of the Central legislation. Fourthly, it was stated that the Mysore Act, to the extent of its amendment, was repugnant to the Central act, and thus, was rendered void as under article 254(1) of the Indian Constitution. Finally, it was argued that the amendments were colourable legislation as the tax was imposed on the prize competitions with the objective of restoring their control to the State. They submitted that the state legislature were imposing penalties upon prize competitions by way of tax, and thus implementing control over such competitions. They further submitted that such taxation was a method of control and regulation, and all matters ancillary to the issue of control and regulation had been surrendered to the Union (via the doctrine of ancillary powers).

=== Respondent ===
N. C. Chatterjee, G. Channappa, R. Gopalakrishnan and T. M. Sen, counsel for the respondents, countered these claims. They submitted that the subject of "betting and gambling" given in entry 34 and the issue of "taxation of luxuries" in entry 62 of List II of the Seventh Schedule of the Indian Constitution were separate powers. This implied that surrendering of control and regulation of prize competitions to the Union did not lead to the surrendering of taxation powers. Thus, they claimed that the power conferred under entry 62 could not have been deemed to have been surrendered. They further submitted that having proven legislative competence, it was unnecessary to prove or disprove any mala fide intentions of the Mysore legislature. It was submitted that the motives of the legislature could not be called into question.

== Decision of the Supreme Court ==
The Supreme Court held that the Central legislation, passed in accordance with article 252(1) of the Indian Constitution, governed entry 34 of List II of the Seventh Schedule, while the amendments made by the Mysore Legislation were done under entry 62 of the same list. These entries covered separate powers, and by passing the resolution under article 252, the States did not surrender their powers of taxation under entry 62. It could not be held that article 252(2) of the Indian Constitution was violated by such an amendment of the Mysore Act, nor could it be held that the amendment amounted to colourable legislation, as the amendment did not amount to indirect control and regulation of prize competitions. The tax imposed by the Mysore legislature's amendments were not in the manner of a penalty, but merely a tax, which was within the legislative competence of the Mysore legislature, under entry 62 of List II of the Seventh Schedule.
