= Reasonable time =

Legal term for the amount of time which is fairly necessary to complete a task

Reasonable time is that amount of time which is fairly necessary, conveniently, to do whatever is required to be done, as soon as circumstances permit.

As a U.S. legal term, the phrase has been a topic of controversy for many years. It is generally used in reference to performing an action or remitting payment, but this is a very vague term which causes litigation problems in many court cases. Uniform Commercial Code section 2-206(2) requires that acceptance of an offer be made within a "reasonable time" if no time is specified:

Where the beginning of a requested performance is a reasonable mode of acceptance, an offeror who is not notified of acceptance within a reasonable time may treat the offer as having lapsed before acceptance.

European Union law refers in the Charter of Fundamental Rights of the European Union to:

- A right to good administration:

Every person has the right to have his or her affairs handled impartially, fairly and within a reasonable time by the institutions, bodies, offices and agencies of the Union (Article 41)

- A right to an effective remedy and to a fair trial:

Everyone is entitled to a fair and public hearing within a reasonable time by an independent and impartial tribunal previously established by law (Article 47).

In 1998 the European Court of Justice reduced the fine imposed on German business Baustahlgewebe for breach of the EU competition rules. In 1989 the European Commission adopted a determination that 14 producers of welded steel mesh had engaged in unlawful restrictions of competition. Baustahlgewebe appealed against the decision on 20 October 1989 but the Court of First Instance did not rule on the case until 6 April 1995, five years and six months later. The Court of Justice held that the case had not been determined within a reasonable time and reduced the ECU 3 million fine by ECU 50,000 (a reduction of 1.67%).

In the United Kingdom's service provision legislation (Supply of Goods and Services Act 1982, section 14, and the Consumer Rights Act 2015, section 52), there is an implied term in a service contract which states that the supplier or trader must carry out the service "within a reasonable time". The term does not apply if the contract specifies a time or a manner for determining the time for the service to be performed. Also under UK law in relation to a construction dispute, section 108 of the Housing Grants, Construction and Regeneration Act 1996 provides a right for one party to a contract to refer a dispute to adjudication. In this context the courts will not recognise that a dispute exists until an issue has been raised by one party and the other party has had a reasonable time to consider the claim. Some cases have addressed questions about the interpretation of "a reasonable time" when the period for addressing a claim covers a holiday period such as Christmas or Easter.

== New Zealand cases ==
- Kean v Dunfoy

== See also ==
- Contractual provisions relating to time
