= Soccer Nelson Inc v Soccer NZ Inc =

- Court: High Court of New Zealand
- Full case name: Soccer Nelson Incorporated v Soccer NZ Incorporated
- Decided: 2 October 1997

Court membership
- Judge sitting: Hammond J

Soccer Nelson Inc v Soccer NZ Inc is a cited case in New Zealand regarding the requirement under section 7(4)(b) of the Contractual Remedies Act 1970 that a breach of a contract must be "substantial" for a contract to be cancelled.

== Background ==
Soccer Nelson were in arrears of its membership fees to Soccer NZ, and as a result Soccer NZ planned to exclude the Nelson branch from a national soccer tournament.

Soccer Nelson argued the arrears were not substantial and filed for an injunction for Soccer NZ to let them play in the tournament.

== Held ==
The court ruled the arrears were substantial, entitling them to be excluded from the tournament. However, the court issued an interim injunction, requiring $30,000 to be paid within 7 days.
