= Clasper v Lawrence =

- Court: High Court
- Full case name: Clasper v Lawrence
- Decided: 17 July 1990
- Citation: [1990] 3 NZLR 231

Court membership
- Judge sitting: Tipping J

Clasper v Lawrence [1990] 3 NZLR 231 is a cited case in New Zealand regarding the quantification of damages for breach of contract.
