= Simon Davies (solicitor) =

British lawyer and businessman

- Born: 1967 (age 58–59)
- Education: University of Cambridge
- Employer: Linklaters LLP

Simon Davies (born 1967) is a British lawyer and businessman. He was appointed as the youngest ever firmwide managing partner at Linklaters in 2008. In 2016, he moved to Lloyds Banking Group to become the chief people, legal and strategy officer and a member of the group's executive committee.

== Career ==
Davies joined Linklaters as a trainee in their London office in 1990 and became partner in 1999. He spent 12 years in Asia, specialising in M&A and Securities advice serving terms in each of Hong Kong and Tokyo. Davies was Managing Partner for Asia from 2003 to 2007. He was then appointed as Firmwide Managing Partner in February 2007 and took up the role in January 2008. At the age of 39, he was the youngest ever person to hold this position. In this role, he chaired the executive committee and was a member of the firm's Partnership Board. He stepped down in 2015 and was replaced by Linklaters former global banking head, Gideon Moore.

Davies is recognised for launching the Linklaters Law and Business School in 2007, which delivers integrated business and technical skills training. He is also credited for a marked improvement in the number of top-tier rankings across the firm's practice areas and strong financial performance under his leadership. Davies has overseen a growth in the firm's geographic coverage particularly in Asia and Africa, and the development of its contentious and regulatory capabilities. Davies has led also efforts to reposition Linklaters as a more progressive and diverse business, with the firm launching a global diversity action plan during his tenure as Firmwide Managing Partner. This has included introducing the target to have at least 30% females on the firm's Partnership Board and executive committee by 2018, and for at least 30% of all new partners to be women. In recognition of its diversity efforts, Linklaters was the first organisation in the UK to be awarded the UK National Equality Standard.

== Other positions ==
Davies is a member of TheCityUK / CBBC China Market Advisory Group, and is closely involved with fostering relations between China and the UK. In 2013, Davies received from the Chinese Ambassador to the UK a fellowship of the 48 Group Club, an independent business network committed to promoting positive China-UK relations.

Davies is also trustee of the National Youth Theatre of Great Britain.

== Qualifications and education ==
Davies was educated at Cambridge University, where he studied law. Davies is a Solicitor of the High Court of the Hong Kong Special Administrative Region, a member of The Dai-ichi Tokyo Bar Association and a Solicitor of the Senior Courts of England and Wales.
