= Simon Davis =

Simon Davis may refer to:

- Simon Davis (Australian cricketer) (born 1959), Australian cricketer
- Simon Davis (English cricketer) (born 1965), English cricketer
- Simon Davis (artist) (born 1968), British artist

== See also ==
- Simon Davies (disambiguation)
- List of people with surname Davis
