= Contractual provisions relating to time =

Terms used in contract law

Several terms and common clauses are used in contracts to refer to time, including usage in reference to the time at which, or the length of the period during which, a contracted activity is to be undertaken.

== Time is of the essence ==
"Time is of the essence" is a term used in contract law in England and Wales (a legal jurisdiction within the United Kingdom), Canada, Australia, New Zealand, other Commonwealth countries and the United States, expressing the need for timely performance of a contractual obligation, i.e. indicating that one or more parties to the agreement must perform by the time to which the parties have agreed if a delay will cause material harm. Where a time is of the essence clause is included in a contract, a court may nonetheless determine that minor delay did not cause material harm and thus that no breach of contract occurred.

"Time is of the essence" may be contrasted with "reasonable time", where a delay in performing may be justified if it is reasonably required, based upon subjective circumstances such as unexpected weather, and with the phrase time at large, which describes a situation where a party to a contract is relieved from the duty to perform work by a specific deadline due to actions of the principal that prevent timely completion.

"Time is of the essence" may also be contrasted with an "express condition", where a specific contract term must be performed to avoid breach, such as in the Court of Appeals of Indiana's decision in Dove v. Rose Acre Farms, Inc. 434 N.E.2d 931 (Ct. App. Ind. 1982).

== Time at large ==
"Time at large" is a common law principle which is covered by a large body of case law. It can arise in four types of situation:

- where no time for performance has ever been agreed as part of the contract
- where a time which was fixed has ceased to apply, by agreement or an act which prevents its fulfillment, including an employer's act of prevention affecting completion
- where the employer has waived the right to insist on completion by the agreed date, or where the contractor is in breach of contract but the employer elects to continue with the contract on a delayed basis, or
- where the employer has failed to comply with the certification process, if this prevents the contract being administered correctly.

The case of Holme v Guppy (1838) confirms the "prevention principle", which states that "if the party be prevented by the refusal of the other contracting party from completing the contract within the time limited he is not liable in law for the default".

Where time is "at large", there is an implied term obliging the contractor to complete the work within a reasonable time. The facts of the case will determine what is a reasonable time. It is generally agreed that it is not in the interests of either an employer or a contractor to move into time being "at large", and Bellhouse and Cowan note that most forms of contract now have "adequate extension of time procedures", so it has become difficult to argue that an "at large" situation has arisen in most situations.

"The principle in Bramall & Ogden" (referring to the case of Bramall & Ogden v Sheffield City Council (1983) 29 BLR 73) established that confused legal drafting can give rise to a situation where time is "at large" due to the absence of agreement on contractual time for performance. In this case, Sheffield had contracted for the construction of 123 houses, which were completed on various dates. The contract provided for liquidated damages applicable on the number of houses incomplete, and stated a date for completion as 6 December 1976. The contract did not provide for sectional completion and the court held that the sectional basis on which the liquidated damages clause was to operate was inconsistent with the single end-date for anticipated completion, meaning that Sheffield were unable to enforce a damages claim for delay.

In Bruno Zornow (Builders) Ltd v Beechcroft Developments (1990), a contract which originally provided for a project's "preliminary works" was later extended to include further works measured against an agreed work programme. The preliminary works had a clear and binding deadline but this was not amended to take account of the further works. The court was required to determine whether "time at large" applied for the further works, subject only to an implied term that it be finished within a reasonable time, or that a contractual date for completion was to be implied. The court held the date which both parties had in mind for the completion of the whole project when the first tender was submitted, as amended by subsequent architect extensions, should apply as the contractual completion date.

"Time at large" arguments may also be utilised in a civil law context.

== Extension of time ==
Standard form contracts such as the Joint Contracts Tribunal (JCT) contract and the New Engineering Contract (NEC) family include various mechanisms for extending contracts to account for delay but still retain the need for the works to be completed by an agreed date.

Case law recognises that there may be a "contiguous extension of time", which commences from the previous date for completion, but also at times a "non-contiguous extension of time", which has a different starting point, after the intended completion date and usually when an event occurs which triggers the argument for an extension being put in place.

== See also ==
- Date certain
- Reasonable time
- Laches
