= Jack v Guy =

- Court: Court of Appeal of New Zealand
- Full case name: NORMAN WILLIAM JACK AND JUDITH ANN JACK Appellant AND MURRAY CLIVE GUY Respondent
- Decided: 1 December 2004
- Transcript: Court of Appeal Judgment Supreme Court judgment

Court membership
- Judges sitting: Hammond J, Chambers J, Young J

Jack v Guy is cited New Zealand case regarding anticipatory breach of contract.

== Background ==
The Jacks owned a forestry block near Fielding and in August 1993 they entered into a contract with Guy to harvest the trees on their property. The contract had a tentative harvest date of February / March 1994, but had the caveat that this was subject to when the harvesting crew was in the area.

The contract also required the Jacks to first obtain the necessary resource consents to harvest the trees and for the roading needed to truck out the timber.

However, the timber market started falling, resulting in Guy's client Raynier bringing forward their harvests to October 1993. Guy informed his client the Jack's that the trees had to be harvested by 14 October 1993. This development caught the Jack's unaware, as at this early stage, the Jacks had not applied for the consents.

Guy advised the Jacks that they were in breach of the contract, and he was now cancelling the contract under section 7(3)(c) of the Contractual Remedies Act.

The Jacks replied that they had not breached the contract, and sued Guy for breach of contract.

== Held ==
Guy was entitled to cancel the contract.
