= Doctrine of colourability =

The doctrine of colourability is the idea that when a legislature wants to do something that it cannot do within the constraints of its government's constitution, it colours the law with a substitute purpose, allowing it to accomplish its original goal.

== India ==
Under the constitution of India, exclusive jurisdiction for the Union and the State has been conferred regarding subject matters of legislation. This has been provided by Article 246, which has demarcated the legislative jurisdiction of the Parliament of India and the state assemblies by outlining the different subjects under List I for the Union, List II for the State, and List III for both, as given in the seventh schedule to the Constitution of India. As a consequence, conflicts of jurisdiction arise due to the fact there exist separate lists for the Union and the State to legislate upon. It often happens that strict constitutional boundaries are transgressed in legislation, inviting judicial review of the said bill/act.

The Enactment of a bill is a function of the legislative power. In order to decide whether particular legislation is unconstitutional for breaching the constitutional limitations of Separation of powers, the Court examines the enactment with some strict scrutiny. The legislature can only make laws within its legislative competence. The legislative competence may be limited by specific List entries, or be restricted by other constitutional limitations and prohibitions. It cannot over-step the area of its legislative capability. A simple rule is followed in this regard, which is to find out if the legislating body had the power to legislate directly. If not, then the legislature cannot legislate indirectly. What it cannot do directly, it cannot attempt to do indirectly. Therefore, the substance of the legislation must be articulated for the purpose of determining whether what it enacted, it could really do.

The question of colourable legislation was fully discussed by the Supreme Court of India in K.C. Gajapati Narayan Deo v. Orissa, a decision which has been treated as settling the law on the subject. This ruling was confirmed in the Supreme Court decision of Sonapur Tea Co. v. Deputy Commissioner.
