= Woods v N J Ellingham & Co Ltd =

Case law in New Zealand

- Court: High Court of New Zealand
- Full case name: Woods v N J Ellingham & Co Ltd
- Citation: [1977] 1 NZLR 218

Court membership
- Judge sitting: Henry J

Woods v N J Ellingham & Co Ltd [1977] 1 NZLR 218 is a cited case in New Zealand regarding implied terms in a contract.

== Background ==
Ellingham was a drainlayer contractor contracted to construct a water treatment plant on the Waikato River, and used Woods as a subcontractor. Woods later experienced abnormal terrain at the site, and later abandoned the job before it had completed the contract.

NJE sued for breach of contract, and Woods defended the matter on the basis that they had experienced abnormal terrain on the job, and so were entitled under implied custom in drainlaying contracts to be paid extra for such work.

== Held ==
The court ruled that Woods had not proved that there was such an implied custom existed, and were accordingly ordered to pay damages.
