= Act (document) =

Type of legal instrument

An act is an instrument that records a fact or something that has been said, done, or agreed. Acts generally take the form of legal instruments of writing that have probative value and executory force. They are usually accepted as self-authenticating demonstrative evidence in court proceedings, though with the precarious status of notaries public and their acts under common law, this is not always so.

Common types of acts are legislative, judicial, and notarial acts.

== Legislative acts ==
Legislative acts (fully, acts of statute), or more commonly statutes, are the cornerstone of statutory and regulatory law. They may include in a monarchical system any royal edict, proclamation, or decree setting forth or establishing law as it affects all citizens. In parliamentary or congressional systems, acts passed by a legislature are known as acts of Parliament or acts of Congress. In Hong Kong, acts of the legislature are instead known as "ordinances".

== Notarial acts ==
A notarial act (or notarial instrument or notarial writing) is any written narration of facts (recitals) drawn up by a notary public or civil-law notary authenticated by his signature and official seal and detailing a procedure which has been transacted by or before him in his official capacity. A notarial act is the only lawful means of proving those facts of which it is the recognized record, whereas on other matters it is usually inadmissible, because, being beyond the powers entrusted to the notary by law, it is non-official. In most common-law countries, multiple-page acts are bound together using a sewn or knotted ribbon (referred to as silk), the ends of which are secured by a wafer impressed with the notary's seal. This is called annexing or annexure.

=== Act in public form ===
The first category is known as an "act in public form" (Fr act en minute, Du minuutakte, It atto conservato, Ger urschriftliche Urkunde, Sp acta protocolar), and is the preserve of notaries-at-law. Public form acts may take the form of a record of some activity which is intended or required to have evidentiary status, legal or administrative force or effect, or commercial effect. Acts in this form remain the cornerstone of civil-law notarial practice according to which they are composed as single narrative instruments written in the first person perspective of the notary. Public-form acts include all contracts and governing instruments (e.g. conveyance, will, trust, power of attorney, gift).

Traditionally, in civil-law countries, the preliminary drafts, called "minutes" (formerly protocols; Fr minute, Du minuut, It minuta, Ger Urschrift, Sp escritura matriz), are jotted in legal shorthand and record only the particulars. Their date, appearer, venue, and subject are logged in a notarial register, and the minutes are retained and kept in the notary's protocol (archive) while an engrossment (Fr/Du grosse, It spedizione in forma esecutiva, Ger Ausfertigung, Sp primer testimonio), a fully extended form in long hand under seal and signature, is handed to the appearer. The minutes are used thereafter as a master copy from which exemplifications (Fr expédition, It spedizione, Sp testimonio ulterio, copia simple, Du authentiek afschrift, uitgifte, Ger beglaubigte Abschrift), i.e. engrossed fair copies, may be made. In common-law countries, notaries prepare multiple duplicate originals fully executed and sealed, as a copy would not be admissible in court. One is archived as a file copy in the notary's protocol.

=== Act in private form ===
The second category is known as an "act in private form" (Fr acte en brevet, Du brevetakte, akte in originali, It atto rilasciato in originale, Ger Urkunde im Original, Sp acta extraprotocolar), best represented by the notarial certificate (or "docquet" in Scotland). This is generally a writing that certifies the due execution in the notary's presence of a deed, contract or other writing or verifies some fact or thing of which the notary has certain knowledge. Notarial certificates are endorsed on or appended to a pre-existing document and attest to its due execution, genuine nature and validity, or legal status and effects. As a safety precaution, the certificate may also contain information such as the number of pages, a description of the document, its title, and any other distinguishing features in order to prevent pages from being added or removed. If affixed, short form certificates may also be embossed with a seal half on the certificate and half on the rest of the page.

Notarial certificates come in full forms or short forms. A full form includes preamble information like the date, venue, appearer's appearance, proof of identification, and so forth, as well as the principal attestation. A short form usually only includes the venue, date, and "attestation clause". Both are then ended with a "testimonium clause".

== See also ==
- Notary public
- Civil law notary
- Documentality
