= Walsh v Kerr =

- Court: Court of Appeal of New Zealand
- Full case name: Walsh v Kerr
- Decided: 7 June 1989
- Citation: [1989] 1 NZLR 490
- Transcript: High Court judgment

Court membership
- Judges sitting: Cooke P, Somers J, Hardie Boys J

Walsh v Kerr [1989] 1 NZLR 490 is a cited case in New Zealand regarding the remedy of damages for breach of contract.

== Background ==
The Kerrs owned a student pub in Dunedin, advertising that the lease of the hotel was guaranteed by Wilson Neil Corporation.

The Walshes subsequently purchased the hotel for $1.1 million. Subsequent to the sale, the Walshes discovered that the guarantee would lapse upon any sale.

The Walshes sued the Kerrs for loss of value of the hotel, but the High Court ruled that they had suffered no loss refusing to award any damages, apart for the sum of $10 for nominal damages.

== Held ==
The Court of Appeal ruled that they had suffered loss, and awarded them damages of $5,000.
