= J & B Caldwell Ltd v Logan House Retirement Home Ltd =

New Zealand court case

- Full case name: J & B Caldwell Ltd v Logan House Retirement Home Ltd
- Decided: 17 November 1998
- Citation: [1999] 2 NZLR 99; (1998) 9 TCLR 112

Court membership
- Judge sitting: Fisher J

J & B Caldwell Ltd v Logan House Retirement Home Ltd [1999] 2 NZLR 99; (1998) 9 TCLR 112 is a cited case in New Zealand regarding the quantification of damages for breach of contract.
