= Chatfield v Jones =

- Court: Court of Appeal of New Zealand
- Full case name: Maurice Leicester Chatfield, Peter Howard Crump Hanson, Richard Ernest Yates v Peter Ernest Jones, Algar Keith Tozer
- Decided: 2 May 1990
- Citation: [1990] 3 NZLR 285
- Transcript: copy of judgment

Court membership
- Judges sitting: Cooke P, Somers J, Hardie Boys J

Chatfield v Jones [1990] 3 NZLR 285 is a cited case in New Zealand regarding the issue of notice of cancellation of a contract, where a contract has been breached.

== Background ==
In November 1986, the parties agreed to transfer the shares in Acorn (Fiji) Limited, which operated a tourist train, in the Coral Coast, Fiji for $875,000. When the purchasers neglected to pay for the shares the following year, the shares were resold for $100,000, and sued the purchasers for the loss.

The purchasers defended the claim, saying they were not notified of the cancellation of the contract.

== Held ==
Held, the court ruled that the vendors statement of claim notified them that the contract had been cancelled.
