= Retail leasing =

Type of business property rental

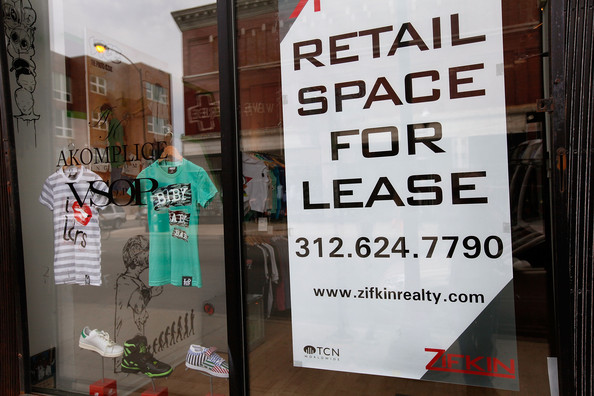
Retail Lease in Chicago

A retail lease is a legal document outlining the terms under which one party agrees to rent property from another party. A lease guarantees the lessee (the renter) use of an asset and guarantees the lessor (the property owner) regular payments from the lessee for a specified number of months or years. Both the lessee and the lessor must uphold the terms of the contract for the lease to remain valid.

== Commercial leasing ==
A commercial lease is meant to be an agreement between the owner of a property and the person looking to initiate some sort of businesses on that land. A retail lease is a kind of commercial lease in premises that are wholly or predominantly used for retail shop businesses. These leases attract additional protections under the law, so it is important to choose what type of lease the business is entering into. Leasing lawyers are specialists in the field of leasing and may be consulted for legal advice when entering a lease. Owning commercial property also means a company has to manage it as well and a business may not be prepared to do that. Newer businesses usually require to pick commercial leasing over property possession as they often do not have the funds flow necessary to buy adequate business space.

=== Definitions ===
A commercial leasing agreement is also called a commercial property, commercial real estate, business, industrial, and office space lease. The individual in ownership of the property to be rented is called the lessor or landlord. The lessee or tenant uses and rents the property owned by the lessor and provides them with monetary compensation.

=== Differences between residential and commercial leases ===
A commercial property lease is different from a residential lease. Residential leases are for tenants looking for property to rent to live in, while commercial leases are intended to be used for business purposes. Generally, commercial leases have less protections in place for the tenant as compared to residential leases. The government assumes tenants involved in businesses agreements are more knowledgeable and are better able to negotiate a pleasurable agreement for themselves, thus allowing each party more bargaining power. Residential leases in most cases contain more protections for the tenant, as of state law. The landlord and tenant could be represented by sophisticated legal counsel, which is not common in residential leases. Also, commercial leases tend to involve a greater significant amount of money.

Another way commercial leases differ is that they are more negotiable. In residential leases a tenant is given a lease contract with little to no opportunity for negotiating the terms. It's not uncommon for commercial landlords to take this approach too, but most are willing to negotiate terms.

Commercial leases on average are also longer than residential leases, at about ten to twelve years. A lease for office space will typically have a five year term with the potential option to renew or extend the lease.

==== Role of brokers ====
It is not uncommon for commercial leases to involve a commercial real estate broker, unlike residential agreements. A broker often works for the landlord on commission. This commission amount is based on the agreement they are able to secure with the tenant in regards to terms such as rent and square footage. Given this information it is known that the broker has a duty to the landlord not the tenant. However, the tenant can hire their own independent broker to aid them in their search for commercial property to rent. This addition would affect the split in broker commission fees, as they would then split them amongst a group of four as opposed to two individuals.

There are several advantages and disadvantages to hiring a broker as a landlord. Utilizing a broker can give the landlord access to the broker's network with members of the community, help them to understand complex tax and zoning laws, negotiate with buyers, etc. A disadvantage comes from the fact that real estate brokers are normally paid by commission. This could lead them to favor higher priced property. Though, with compensation of a flat fee as opposed to commission this behavior could be counteracted.

Warranty of Habitability

A landlord of commercial property does not have to ensure that the space is habitable, other than there being heat and hot water in addition to the other codes or laws. In a residential property the space has to be safe, clean, and in decent condition. However, the landlord in a commercial lease doesn't have to maintain the premises or common areas. More of that responsibility is passed onto the tenant, who would likely take the space "as it".

==== Rent regulation ====
Commercial agreements can also have rent fees much more expensive than those in residential agreements, because there is not a ceiling on how high they can go. Residential properties are more controlled. This is another reason a tenant may benefit from having legal counsel aid in their negotiations with a landlord.

A prospective tenant or landlord some become familiar with differences such as these to further their understanding of the law before entering into a lease agreement for the first time.

=== Types of agreements ===
There is no universal, standard commercial property lease. Each business is different as are their owners, so each require different needs. The following are examples of the different types of lease agreements parties will likely find themselves in:

==== Net lease ====
In this type of agreement, the landlord will undertake none of the operational expenses associated with the commercial property. Instead, the tenant assumes the cost of base rent as well as a percentage of the property costs depending on the amount of the property they occupy. Double Net and Triple net are two variations of this agreement type.

==== Full-service lease ====
In this type of agreement, the tenant pays one lump sum amount to the landlord in exchange for various services. Those services vary but generally include utilities, maintenance, security, and janitorial. It's also common for this lease agreement to be used in office buildings with more than one tenant.

==== Gross lease ====
In this type of agreement, the landlord receives a gross payment of rent from the tenant, who is also responsible for paying their own utilities. The other property expenses are to be paid by the landlord. In some cases, however, the tenant is responsible to share in the costs of associated with the property if they go over a certain amount. These are the variations for this gross lease:

==== Flat lease ====
This agreement is a variation of the gross lease in which the tenant pays a fixed price for a set period of time. This agreement is often used by small businesses.

==== Step lease ====
This agreement is also a variation of the gross lease. This contract takes into account the rise in the expenses covered by the landlord by increasing the tenant's base rent each period.

==== Percentage lease ====
In this agreement type, a percentage of the tenant's gross revenue earned in operating their business may be required as payment to the landlord. In addition, a portion of landlords may also require base rent payments each period. What is described to be gross revenue can vary by lease agreement, some items are deducted in this calculation such as sales tax or returned products.

=== Negotiation ===
In most cases, the terms of a commercial property lease agreement are negotiable between the tenant and landlord. There are however several factors that effect how much the different terms can be negotiated.

==== Leasehold improvements ====
This section of a lease agreement details what remodeling to the property will be covered by the tenant or landlord. This could include improvements such as ceiling tiles or security systems. This section will also detail when each improvement will be made, by whom, and at what cost. These things may be contingent on the duration of the lease and the amount of space the tenant is occupying during their stay.

==== Lease duration ====
The amount of time agreed upon for an occupant to use rented property can generally be negotiated. It's common for landlords to argue for longer leases and for tenants for argue for shorter or mid length terms, each offering the tenant and landlord different benefits or disadvantages.

==== Exclusivity ====
This section is not generally included in a basic business lease agreement, but it may be requested by the tenant. It prevents the landlord from renting out additional property for use by another business operating in the sell of a similar product or service.

==== Use of premises ====
This clause details what business operations are allowed or not allowed by the tenant while occupying the rented space. This clause often favors tenants already present on the premises owned by the landlord, as it can aid in eliminating additional competition between existing tenants.

==== Bargaining power ====
The amount of bargaining power a party has during negotiations for in a commercial lease agreement can vary based on the amount of leverage they hold. This can include "the vacancy rate in the relevant geographic locale, prestige of the rental space, tenant mix, tenant's business and industry, and tenant's economic goodwill". Reputable or influential tenants can be of benefit to a landlord with several vacant properties to fill, as that tenant may attract others to the area. The same could be said for a valuable location.

==== Termination ====
Lease contracts may include terminology allowing a landlord the legal right to terminate a tenant's stay if they sell, tear down, or rehabilitate their building. The landlord however is required to give notice to the tenant.

==== Sublease ====
Permission from the landlord may also be necessary for someone wishing to sublease their space, even from someone looking to take over the business. A tenant may request special language be added to the agreement preventing the landlord from preventing the reassignment with good reason.

==== Other considerations ====
There are various factors a small business owner may consider before deciding to enter into a lease agreement or purchase property for their business. The SBA compiled a list of some of those factors to take into consideration: Operating Requirements, Capital supply and Needs, Financing and Payment Flexibility, Resale Value, Equipment, and Taxes.

Other common clauses of this lease that are added and negotiated may include: Hours of Operation, Repairs, and Defined space to be leased.

==== Subordination attornment and non-disturbance clause ====
This clause is used in commercial leases to lay out the rights between a tenant, landlord, and third party. It consists of three parts: subordination, attornment, and non-disturbance. The circumstances in which this clause comes into play is very common.

===== Subordination =====
This first clause impacts the tenant the most. It moves the interests of the tenant, or leasehold, up to a junior position above a third party. This position comes into play if the landlord decides to use the building as collateral. This may disadvantage the tenant as it gives the landlord the ability to terminate their lease if the building is foreclosed upon.

===== Non-Disturbance =====
Given the terms of the subordination section, this non-disturbance clause gives the tenant more protection. It allows them to continue operating in the space as long as they make their payments, subordinate their interests, and agree to recognize a new landlord if the property is sold or foreclosed. If a tenant did not include this clause they could be at risk of loss of business and an influx of new expenses due a change in location if there lease is terminated.

===== Attornment =====
Finally, the attornment clause involves the relationship between the tenant and a new owner. As mentioned before, the tenant must recognize and accept a new landlord. This means that they would assume all the previous landlord's rights and responsibilities listed and agreed upon in the lease agreement with the tenant.

=== Commercial leasing alternatives ===
It some instances a commercial lease may not be a good fit for an entrepreneur. In that case they may consider alternatives, so here are some of the most common:

==== Co-working space ====
This alternative is common with tech start ups. They offer an array of terms that are generally short not long term options.

==== Incubator ====
These also offer short term options for working space, about two to three years. Spaces such as these are similar to commercial leases in that they are open to a variety of different business types, but several of the facilities within the building are shared.

==== Market stall ====
These offer business owners the opportunity to operate without a commitment to a commercial lease. However, it still requires the necessary licenses, permits, and compliance with regulations
