= Lost volume seller =

Lost volume seller is a legal term in the law of contracts. Such a seller is a special case in contract law. Ordinarily, a seller whose buyer breaches a contract and refuses to purchase the goods can recover from the breaching buyer only the difference between the contract price and the price for which the seller ultimately sells the goods to another buyer (plus, under some circumstances, incidental damages).

Note that this concept could also apply to intangible goods like intellectual properties.

In the case of a lost volume seller, the seller goes on to sell the goods to someone else, usually for the same price. Under the usual measure of damages, such a seller would have no damages (the contract price, less the sale price to the other customer, is zero), and the breaching buyer would have no liability.

The objective of the law of contracts with respect to damages is to put the aggrieved party in as good a position as the aggrieved party would have been in if the breaching party had fully performed. The ordinary measure of damages fails to put the lost volume seller in as good a position as the lost volume seller would have been if the breaching buyer had been fully performed. The lost volume seller would have had the profit from two sales if the first buyer had performed, instead of the profit from only one sale as a result of the first buyer's breach. In such a case, some laws (including Article 2 of the Uniform Commercial Code in the United States) permit the aggrieved seller to recover the lost profit that the seller would have made if the buyer had not breached (plus, under some circumstances, incidental damages).

Lost volume sellers tend to be those whose capacity to sell or to produce or acquire the subject goods is sufficiently large to meet the demands of all customers who seek to buy those goods. The term generally arises in the context of a breach of contract action in which the selling party seeks to recover against a breaching buyer who repudiates his or her promise to buy. For a lost volume seller, the failure to make one sale (because of the buyer's breach) reduces the seller's profit by the amount of profit that would have accrued from the sale.

== Example ==
For example, if a T-shirt maker has 100 T-shirts, and a customer agrees to buy a shirt from the seller and then breaches that agreement (i.e. refuses to take delivery and pay), the seller will likely be able sell the shirt at the same price to the next customer who walks in. Such a seller has no damages by the usual measure (there is no difference between the contract price with the breaching buyer and the price paid by the buyer who subsequently bought the T-shirt).

However, if the seller has the ability to sell a shirt to any customer who walks in, the customer who breaches the agreement to buy has prevented the seller from earning profit that the seller would have earned if the agreement had been honored. The initial buyer’s breach has caused the seller to receive the profit from only one sale (the sale to the second buyer), instead of the profit from two sales (the sale to the second buyer, plus the sale for which the breaching buyer contracted).

Accordingly, the T-shirt seller can recover from the breaching buyer the profit that the seller would have made on the sale of the T-shirt for which the breaching buyer contracted.

== Sources ==
- Neri v. Retail Marine Corp., 285 N.E.2d 311 (N.Y. 1972) and UCC §2-708(2).
- Snyder v. Greenbaum, 38 Md. App. 144, at 154,155 (M.D. 1977).
