= Simon Davies (English TV presenter) =

English designer (born 1963)

Simon Davies (born 6 December 1963) is an English designer, interior decorator and television presenter working in Sweden.

He works with his partner Tomas Cederlund.

== Television shows ==
- Roomservice - Kanal 5
- Från koja till slott - TV 3
- Design: Simon och Tomas - TV 3
