= Kean v Dunfoy =

- Court: High Court of New Zealand
- Full case name: Kean v Dunfoy
- Decided: 23 June 1952
- Citation: [1952] NZLR 611

Court membership
- Judge sitting: Stanton J

Kean v Dunfoy [1952] NZLR 611 is a cited New Zealand case regarding implied time limits to accept an offer, otherwise the offer lapses. In this case, it was held that a period of 12 months in accepting an offer was too long.

== Background ==
Dunfoy purchased a section from Kean, and Dunfoy accepted the sale terms in September 1950. However, after paying the deposit, Dunfoy did not communicate his acceptance of Kean's offer until 12 months later in September 1951. Kean refused to settle, and instead resold the section to another party. Dunfoy sought specific performance under the initial sales agreement or damages.

== Held ==
The Court held that to accept an offer, a party must communicate their acceptance of the offer within a reasonable period of time. Here it was held that a period of 12 months was not a reasonable period of time to let lapse.
