= Date certain =

Date certain is a legal term for the date on or by which the actions of a contract can be reasonably completed. Ambiguity may nonetheless result, for example when a contract requires that action be taken "by" a specified date that may mean either "by a certain date" or "on or before a certain date".
