= Contentious jurisdiction =

In English ecclesiastical law, contentious jurisdiction (Latin: forum contentiosum) is jurisdiction over matters in controversy between parties, in contradistinction to voluntary jurisdiction, or that exercised upon matters not opposed or controverted.

It is the first form of jurisdiction exercised by the International Court of Justice, involving resolving of disputes between states that are under international law.
