= Glynn v Margetson =

English case on the law of carriage of goods by sea

Glynn v Margetson [1893] A.C. 351
- Court: House of Lords
- Citation: [1893] A.C. 351

Keywords
- Contract law; Fundamental breach

Glynn v Margetson is an English case on the law of carriage of goods by sea which established the "Main Purpose Rule" in relation to deviation.

== Facts ==
A vessel, the Zena, was chartered to carry a perishable cargo of Seville oranges from Málaga to a marmalade factory in Liverpool. The bill of lading provided that the master was "at liberty to visit any ports in any order". Although a carrier has a duty to "proceed with reasonable despatch" and not to deviate from the agreed course, the ship visited other ports in Spain and North Africa before heading for Liverpool. The deviation caused delays in delivering the cargo, during which time both the cargo and the market for oranges had deteriorated. The cargo-owner sued.

== Judgment ==
The House of Lords held that the "liberty clause" was in effect an exemption clause which sought to limit the carrier's liability for loss caused through unjustifiable deviation. The court went on to establish the "Main Purpose Rule" which provided that no exemption rule may cut into the main purpose of the contract. Accordingly, the carrier was not permitted the protection of the liberty clause and thus was liable for the loss.

Lord Herschell LC declared: ‘Where general words are used in a printed form which are obviously intended to apply, ...to a particular contract, ... I think you are justified in looking at the main object and intent of the contract and in limiting the general words used, having in view that object and intent.’

== Significance ==
Although the liberty clause could not be relied upon to condone major breach, it follows that exemption clauses might be allowed to excuse breaches of peripheral or minor obligations.

The Main Purpose Rule was subsequently adopted by the general English contract law in the 1956 case of Karsales v Wallis, recast as the "Fundamental Breach" doctrine. The Karsales case has since been limited in effect by subsequent decisions and statutes:

- The 1967 House of Lords decision of the Suisse Atlantique,
- The Photo Production v Securicor 1980,
- The Unfair Contract Terms Act 1977, and
- The Consumer Rights Act 2015.

Although the effect of Karsales has been blunted, the rule in Glynn v Margetson remains as sharp as ever, although the law on deviation was diluted by Art IV Rule 4 of the Hague-Visby Rules.

Glynn v Margetson was cited in:

- The Starsin
- George Mitchell (Chesterhall) Ltd v Finney Lock Seeds Ltd

== See also ==
- Leduc v Ward
