= Bunkering =

Supply of fuel for use by ships

Tatiana B and Florence B, two bunkering tankers

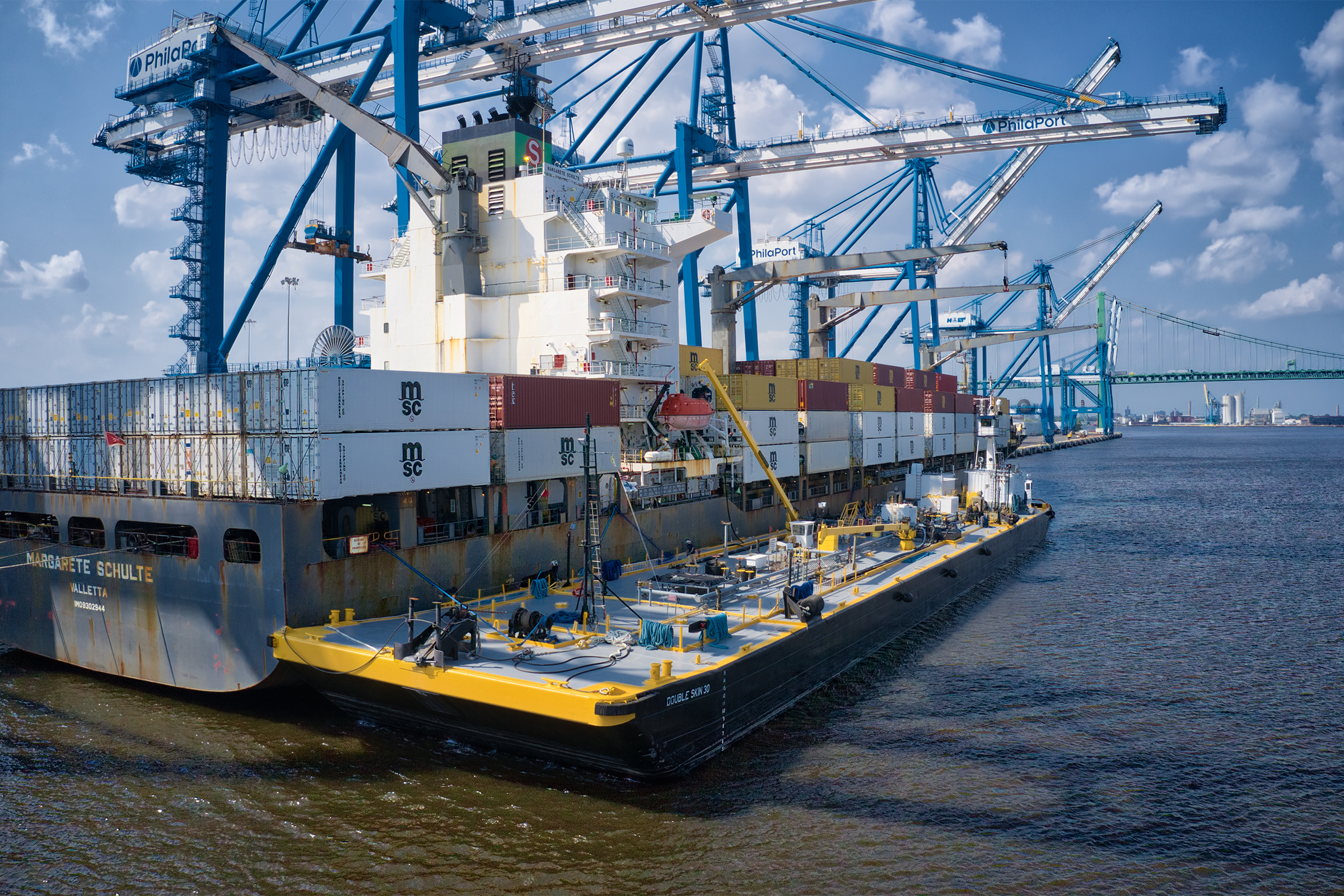
The bunker barge Double Skin 30 refuels the Margarete Schulte container ship in Philadelphia, Pennsylvania.

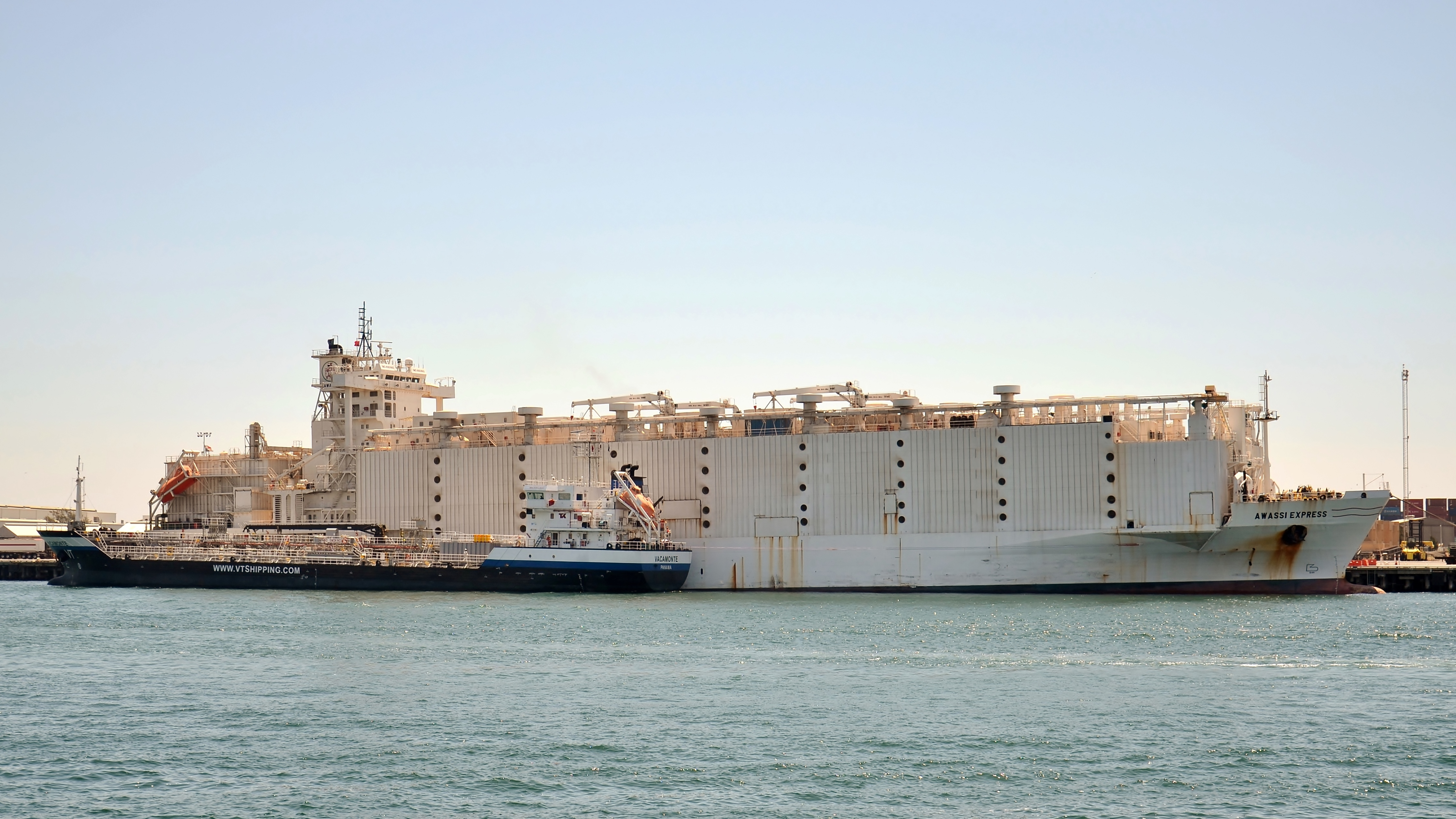
A livestock carrier receiving fuel from a bunker vessel in Fremantle Harbour, Australia

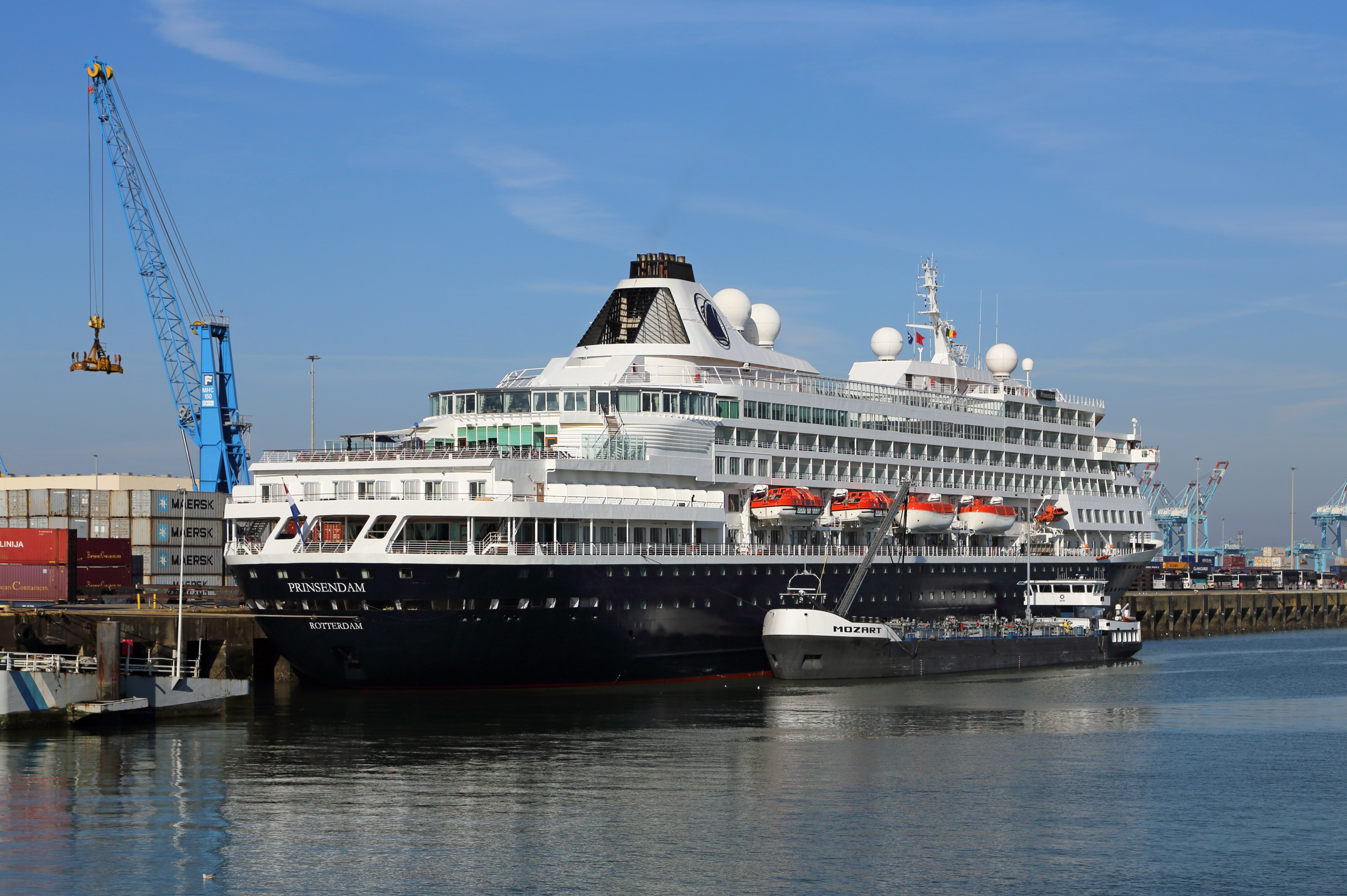
Dutch cruise ship Prinsendam receiving fuel from bunkering tanker Mozart in the port of Zeebrugge, Belgium

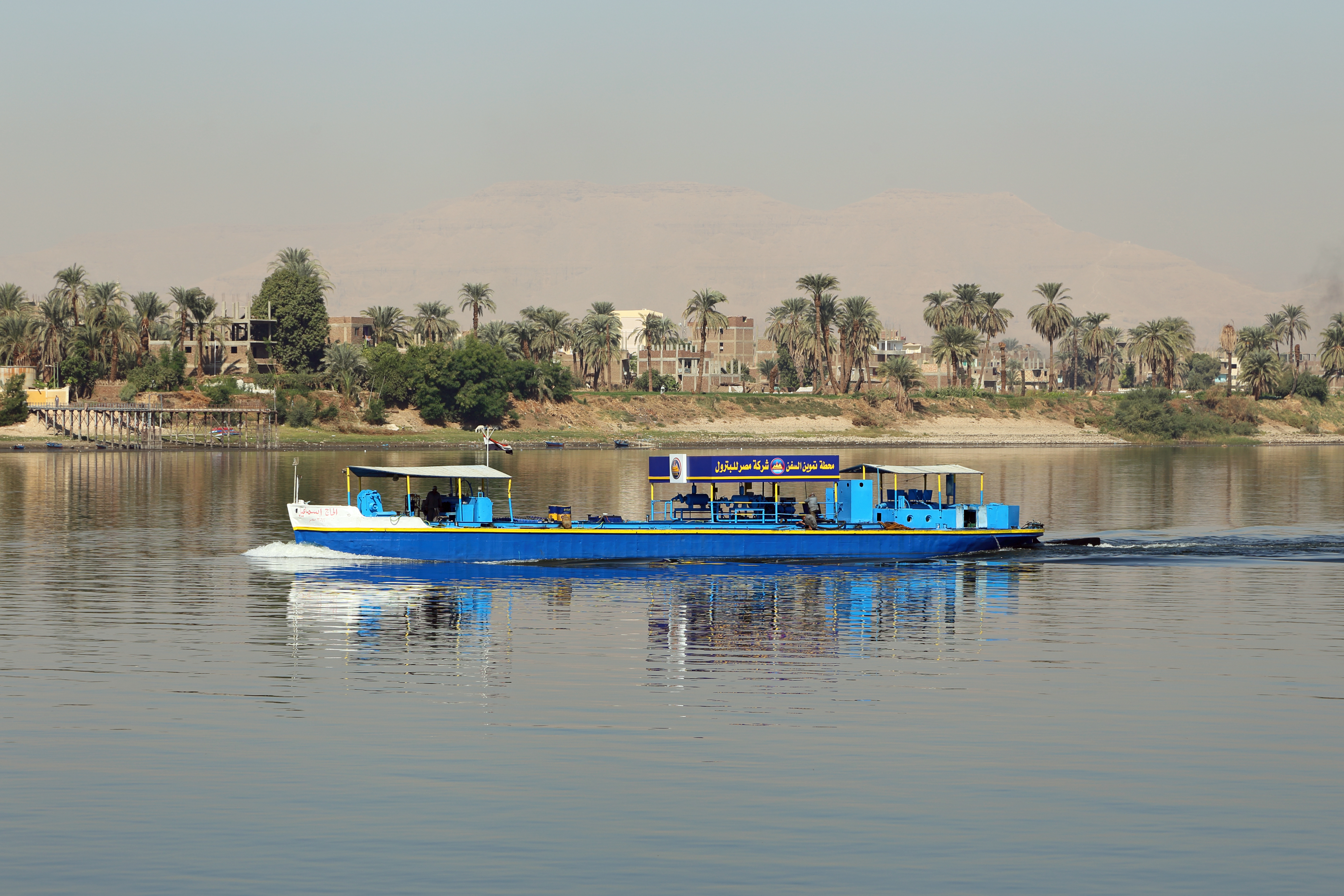
Bunkering tanker on the Nile near Luxor, Egypt

Bunkering is the supplying of fuel for use by ships (such fuel is referred to as bunker), including the logistics of loading and distributing the fuel among available shipboard tanks. A person dealing in trade of bunker (fuel) is called a bunker trader.

The term bunkering originated in the days of steamships, when coal was stored in bunkers. Nowadays, the term bunker is generally applied to the petroleum products stored in tanks, and bunkering to the practice and business of refueling ships. Bunkering operations take place at seaports and include the storage and provision of the bunker (ship fuels) to vessels.

The Port of Singapore is currently the largest bunkering port in the world. In 2023, Singapore recorded bunker fuel sales volume totaling 51,824,000 tonnes, setting a new industry standard.

The Island of Malta is known to host bunkering, in six locations including Hurd's bank. In 2015 the Malta-Sicily Channel was noted as "one of the most important oil transit routes in the world," and in 2011, around eight vessels per day bunkered in Maltese waters.

== Two types of bunkering ==
The two most common types of bunkering procedure at sea are "ship to ship bunkering" (STSB), in which one ship acts as a terminal, while the other moors. The second type is "stern line bunkering" (SLB), which is the easiest method of transferring oil but can be risky during bad weather.

== Bunkering in maritime law ==
In many maritime contracts, such as charter parties, contracts for carriage of goods by sea, and marine insurance policies, the ship-owner or ship operator is required to ensure that the ship is seaworthy. Seaworthiness requires not only that the ship be sound and properly crewed, but also that it be fully fuelled (or "bunkered") at the start of the voyage. If the ship operator wishes to bunker en route, this must be provided for in a written agreement, or the interruption of the voyage may be deemed to be deviation (a serious breach of contract). If the vessel runs out of fuel in mid-ocean, this also constitutes serious breach, allowing the insurer to cancel a policy and allowing a consignee to make a cargo claim. It may also lead to a salvage operation.

The International Maritime Organisation is an agency of the United Nations responsible for the prevention of marine pollution by ships. On 1 January 2020, the agency began enforcing the IMO 2020 regulation of MARPOL Annex VI to minimise bunkering's environmental impact.
