= Harbutt's "Plasticine" Ltd v Wayne Tank and Pump Co Ltd =

English contract law case

Harbutt's "Plasticine" Ltd v Wayne Tank and Pump Co Ltd [1970] is an English contract law case involving the quantum of damages and the concept of fundamental breach. It was heard in the Court of Appeal by Lord Denning MR, Widgery LJ and Cross LJ.

The concept of fundamental breach has not proved to be durable, and that aspect of this case was disapproved in the House of Lords' decision in Photoproductions v Securicor.

== The case ==
The plaintiff company engaged the defendants to design and install in their factory, an old mill, a pipe system to convey hot molten wax used in the production of Plasticine. The defendants unwisely chose to use plastic piping. Once installed, the defendants chose to initiate the new system at night, but without any supervision. The system had a faulty thermostat and molten wax overheated. The plastic pipes melted and the molten wax escaped and caught fire, causing a huge conflagration. By the morning, the entire factory was destroyed. This led to one of the biggest-ever claims for damages in England. The defendant sought to rely on a clause in the contract that purported to limit their liability for breach of contract.

In the Suisse Atlantique, the House of Lords had previously declared that whether or not a fundamental breach extinguishes any protection of a limitation clause was a question of construction and not a question of law.

Following Karsales Ltd v Wallis (and ignoring Suisse Atlantique) the Court of Appeal held that the breach was so gross as to be "fundamental breach", and that the exemption clause thereby "automatically" became ineffective, so that the defendants were liable in full.

Also, since the company had to build a new factory (because it was not feasible to repair the old), Lord Denning said that (contrary to the usual rules of damages and ‘betterment’ in insurance claims), the defendant was liable to pay for a new replacement.

Subsequently, the House of Lords in Photoproductions v Securicor criticised the Harbutt's decision and reaffirmed their earlier view expressed in the Suisse Atlantique.
