= Leduc v Ward =

Leduc v Ward [1893] A.C. 351
- Court: Court of Appeal of England and Wales
- Citation: (1888) 20 QBD 4751

Keywords
- Contract law

Leduc v Ward is a leading English case on deviation within the law of carriage of goods by sea. The case also addresses bills of lading, and the parol evidence rule.

== Facts ==
A vessel was to carry a cargo of rape seed from Fiume (now Rijeka) to Dunkirk, the itinerary made explicit in the bill of lading. Before reaching Dunkirk, the master deviated to Scotland where the ship sank in a storm off the mouth of the River Clyde. When the cargo-owner (the indorsee of the bill of lading) sued, the shipowners sought to rely on the perils of the sea exception in the bill. When it was pointed out that deviation annuls such protection, the shipowners contended that the deviation was justified since the shippers were aware at the time of shipment of the intention to call at Glasgow (a fact which the shipper acknowledged). The shipowners also argued that the ship would inevitably have been lost anyway, as there were storm conditions off Dunkirk as well as in the Firth of Clyde.

== Judgment ==
The Court of Appeal applied the parol evidence rule (which provides that "extrinsic evidence is inadmissible to vary a written contract") and held that the bill was conclusive evidence of the terms of the contract. It followed that the shipper's awareness of the route was inadmissible, as a bill of lading in the hands of the indorsee should be absolutely reliable. Therefore, the deviation was not justifiable and the shipowner, who was denied the protection of "perils of the sea", was liable to the cargo-owner. The secondary argument that a sinking was inevitable because of the ubiquity of the storm was dismissed out of hand as hypothetical.

== Significance ==
The case shows that deviation is deemed to be a very serious breach of a contract of carriage, and if (as here) the deviation is unjustifiable, exemption clauses will not be permitted to protect the carrier from liability.

Five years later, the case of Glynn v Margetson took a similar view, and these strict rules on deviation remain as valid as ever, although the law on deviation was diluted by Art IV Rule 4 of the Hague-Visby Rules.

Leduc v Ward was cited in the case of Tradigrain SA and Others v King Diamond Marine Limited, The Spiros C.

== See also ==
- Karsales v Wallis
