= Privity =

Legal term

Privity is a common law doctrine that governed the liability and obligations of contracting parties. Once an important concept in contract law, these relationships and obligations now fall within the scope of modern statutory laws, diminishing its relevance to modern proceedings.

== Contract law ==
The principle of privity in the common law's law of contract dictates that persons may not reap the benefits nor suffer the burdens of a contract to which they were not a party. Under the doctrine, if a consumer bought goods from a retailer who had originally bought them from the manufacturer, then, if the goods proved faulty, the consumer should sue the retailer. The consumer could not sue the manufacturer in contract law because no contract existed between them. The retailer could then claim against the manufacturer. In most cases, however, consumers may rely on the manufacturer's guarantee that will have been assigned to them.

In England, the leading privity case was Tweddle v Atkinson [1861] EWHC J57 (QB), but this case immediately revealed the limits of the doctrine and two Law Commission reports proposed reform. Finally, English law was amended by the Contracts (Rights of Third Parties) Act 1999, which allows non-party beneficiaries of a contract to enforce the contract, substantially modifying the doctrine.

However, the doctrine has not been completely abolished. In particular the question arises as to whether a third party (such as an employee, agent, stevedore, or freight forwarder) may rely upon an exemption clause limiting liability in a contact between two others. The matter was addressed in Scruttons v Midland Silicones [1961] UKHL 4, where Lord Reid gave guidelines which were subsequently followed in New Zealand Shipping v Sattersthwaite [1974] UKPC 1. The cases of Norwich CC v Harvey [1989] 1 WLR 828 and Adler v Dickson [1955] 1 QB 158 also shed light on this area of law.

== US federal law ==
In the US federal law of res judicata, privity is said to preclude a party to a legal action from raising an issue that either was raised or could have been raised in previous legal action. Under federal law, "concepts summarized by the term privity are looked to as a means of determining whether the interests of the party against whom claim preclusion is asserted were represented in prior litigation." Therefore, privity in federal common law is "a convenient means of expressing conclusions that are supported by independent analysis." Because privity is actually a term to summarize a conclusion that one party was precluded, it "may exist for the purpose of determining one legal question but not another depending on the circumstances and legal doctrines at issue."

== See also ==
- Privity in English law
- Privity of estate
- Third party beneficiary
