= Fundamental breach =

Concept within the common law of contract

Fundamental breach of contract, is a controversial concept within the common law of contract. The doctrine was, in particular, nurtured by Lord Denning, Master of the Rolls from 1962 to 1982, but it did not find favour with the House of Lords.

Whereas breach of condition is a serious breach that "denies the plaintiff the main benefit of the contract", fundamental breach was supposed to be even worse, with the result that any exclusion clause limiting the defendant's liability would automatically become void and ineffective. Also, whereas breach of condition gives the plaintiff the option to repudiate, fundamental breach automatically discharges the entire contract.

Although the concept caused some excitement in the 1950s and 1960s, the concept was regarded as flawed by the Law Lords, whose decision in the Suisse Atlantique case substantially curtailed the doctrine, which has now been effectively abandoned in England and Canada. The relevant concept in English Law, where a fundamental aspect of a contract is breached, is repudiatory breach.

== Background – the law of deviation ==
The origins of the idea of fundamental breach may be traced to early cases on the doctrine of deviation. In Davis v. Garrett Tindal C.J. stated that a carrier's deviation from the agreed voyage route amounted also to a deviation from the terms of the contract, including its exceptions or limitation clauses provided by such a contract. This view was adopted in the leading cases of Leduc v Ward (1888) and Glynn v Margetson (1893).

In Leduc v Ward, a vessel bound from Fiume (modern day Rijeka) to Dunkirk headed instead towards Glasgow, sinking in a storm in the Clyde estuary. The court held that even though the shipper may have known of the planned deviation, the parol evidence rule meant that the route described in the bill of lading was conclusive, and that the deviation was actionable, preventing the carrier from invoking the protection of the "perils of the sea" exemption.

Similarly, in Glynn v Margetson, a vessel carrying Seville oranges from Málaga to Liverpool deviated from the agreed route, by heading first to Burriana (near Valencia). This deviation caused delay and deterioration of the perishable cargo. The carrier relied on a 'liberty clause' in the bill of lading which purported to allow the vessel 'liberty to visit any port in any order'. In the House of Lords, Lord Herschell LC declared the liberty clause to be an exemption clause in disguise, adding "the main object of this bill of lading is the carriage of oranges from Málaga to Liverpool". He thus established the "main purpose rule", holding that no exclusion clause would be allowed to cut into the main purpose of any contract.

Tate & Lyle v Hain Steamship Company was a further deviation case following this approach.

== Adoption of fundamental breach within contract law ==
Although the 19th century cases were maritime cases, the idea of the "main purpose" caught on in the general law of contract after Lord Greene MR, in Alderslade v. Hendon Laundry Ltd.(1945), labelled the fundamental term as ‘the hard core of the contract'.

In Karsales v Wallis [1956] EWCA Civ 4 a buyer inspected a car dealer's used Buick car and agreed to buy it. The car was later delivered at night, and had been towed. When the buyer inspected the car in the morning, it would not work and it was clear it had been involved in an accident, and there were other changes: its tyres had been replaced by old ones, body parts were missing, and the engine's cylinder head was detached, revealing burnt valves. This was a serious breach, but the dealer sought to rely on a clause in the contract which read "No condition or warranty that the vehicle is roadworthy or as to its age, condition or fitness for any purpose is given by the owner or implied herein."

Although the clause was clear and well drafted, the Court of Appeal declared that a "car" was a "vehicle capable of self-propulsion", and accordingly this Buick was not a proper car. Following Glynn v Margetson and using its "main purpose" concept, the court held that the dealer was "in breach of a fundamental obligation" and so could not rely on any exclusion clause.

This decision was clearly fair to the buyer, and Karsales v Wallis soon became the leading case on "fundamental breach". As a matter of law, under the doctrine of fundamental breach of contract, exclusion clauses were deemed not to be available to a party in fundamental breach of the contract. However, all was not well, as business people felt alarmed that an agreed contract term could be set aside by a court; there seemed to be no "certainty".

Also, there arose some confusion as to what "fundamental breach" actually was. Some alleged it was a breach that went to "the root of the contract", a breach so fundamental it would permit the distressed party to repudiate the contract and claim damages. However, since both common law and statute already recognised that while that breach of warranty entitled a claimant only to damages, any breach of condition would entitle a claimant to both repudiation and damages, it seemed that fundamental breach offered nothing new. (Note: In other words, fundamental breach was not some kind of "super breach of condition".)

== Resolution – the Suisse Atlantique ==
The matter came to a head in 1966 in the House of Lords decision in Suisse Atlantique Societe d'Armement Maritime S.A. v. N.V. Rotterdamsche Kolen Centrale. The case involved a two-year time charter to export coal, the shipowners to be paid freight dependent on tonnage of cargo carried. If laytime (the allowable period for the charterer to arrange loading and unloading) were exceeded, the charterers were to pay demurrage of $1,000 per day. The charterers caused huge delays and few round trips were made. Demurrage totalled only $150,000, so the owners claimed damages for their full losses, saying they should not be limited to the demurrage terms because the charterer's gross delays amounted to fundamental breach.

The House of Lords boldly held that Karsales Ltd v Wallis had overstated the law, and that whether or not a fundamental breach extinguishes any protection that the defendant might rely on was a "question of construction" and not a "question of law". (Note: i.e not automatic) Although the demurrage clause was so absurdly low that it amounted to an exemption clause, nevertheless its existence plainly showed that the parties had contemplated the possibility of delay, so delays would not amount to fundamental breach.

After the Suisse Atlantique decision, there was a series of cases where the Court of Appeal patently ignored the House of Lords' findings. One such case was Harbutt's "Plasticine" Ltd v Wayne Tank and Pump Co Ltd. The House of Lords was less than amused, and in the 1980 Photo Productions case they emphatically reaffirmed their decision in the Suisse Atlantique. Lord Wilberforce effectively overturned the "rule of law" doctrine of Karsales Ltd v Wallis and instead maintained a strict "rule of construction" approach whereby a fundamental breach is determined by examining the full circumstances, such as the parties' intentions at the time of the contract.

These two cases (the Suisse Atlantique and Photo Productions) thus formed the definitive statement of the law up to the Unfair Contract Terms Act 1977. (Note: Since amended by the Consumer Rights Act 2015)

More recently, this law was successfully applied in two cases related to carriage of goods by sea and application of limitation clauses under the Hague-Visby Rules: Daewoo Heavy Industries Ltd. v. Klipriver Shipping Ltd. and The Happy Ranger. In Internet Broadcasting Corporation Ltd. t/a NETTV v MAR LLC t/a Marhedge (2009), Moss J ruled that a court "would expect to see 'clear' language in the sense of 'strong' language" before accepting that a contract exempted one of the parties from the consequences of a repudiatory breach. In that particular case he concluded that the wording did not extend to the deliberate personal repudiatory breach which the defendant had exhibited.

Although the Suisse Atlantique case has taken the sting out of the fundamental breach idea, in deviation itself little has changed. Glynn v Margetson still holds, so that not only may deviating carriers be denied the protection of exemption clauses expressly in the contract, they will also be denied the protection of implicit exemptions such as Article IV of the Hague-Visby Rules. However, given the general move in the common law away from strict liability to a standard of "reasonable care" (or "due diligence"), this may change in due course. One commentary on Marhedge noted that in that case the repudiatory breach was the personal action of the company's president and "controlling mind", but warned that legal interpretation might differ in a case where the decision to repudiate was the collective decision of a board of directors.

== Canada ==
The doctrine of fundamental breach has been “laid to rest” by the Supreme Court of Canada in Tercon Contractors Ltd. v. British Columbia (Transportation and Highways) in 2010. In its place, the court has created a three-step test to evaluate the application of exclusion clauses. The first step is to evaluate the exclusion clause in the factual context of each case to determine if it applies to the material circumstances. The second step is to evaluate if the exclusion clause was unconscionable at the time of incorporation. The final step is to evaluate whether the exclusion clause should not be enforced on public policy grounds.

== See also ==
- Maxine Footwear Company Ltd. v. Canadian Government Merchant Marine Ltd (1957)
- Breach of contract
- Pacta sunt servanda, a brocard or basic principle of law
- Terms in English contract law
