= Grant v Norway =

Judicial decision

Grant v Norway (1851) is a case on the law of carriage of goods by sea; but since 1992 it has no longer been good law.

This was an action upon the case by the indorsees of a bill of lading, against the owners of a vessel, to recover the amount of advances made by the former upon the bills of lading, the goods never having in fact been shipped.

The court held that a statement in a bill of lading that goods have been shipped is of only prima facie evidential value, and its terms may be rebutted by evidence to the contrary.

The justification for the case was that a carrier should not suffer liability if (as was not uncommon at the time) the ship's master had fraudulently colluded with a dishonest shipper and had issued a bill declaring untruthfully that goods had been loaded. (The master would normally be both an employee and an agent of the carrier, but would (in both roles) be acting in breach of the legal fiduciary duty to his employer/principal).

The Hague-Visby Rules continued with this view, with Article III (4) stating:

"Such a bill of lading shall be prima facie evidence of the receipt by the carrier of the goods as therein described in accordance with paragraph 3 (a), (b) and (c). However, proof to the contrary shall not be admissible when the bill of lading has been transferred to a third party acting in good faith."

Although the UK has adopted the Hague-Visby Rules, for the purposes of English Law a bill of lading is now deemed to be conclusive (not merely prima facie) evidence of receipt as a result of section 4 of the Carriage of Goods by Sea Act 1992. The reason for the change is that the Law Commission deemed that, if international confidence were to be maintained, it was crucial that a bill of lading should be relied upon as a conclusive statement of fact. It follows that the main rule Grant v Norway has been rendered void by the 1992 Act.

== See also ==
- Bill of lading
- Charterparty
- Law of agency
