= Scruttons Ltd v Midland Silicones Ltd =

1961 UK House of Lords legal case

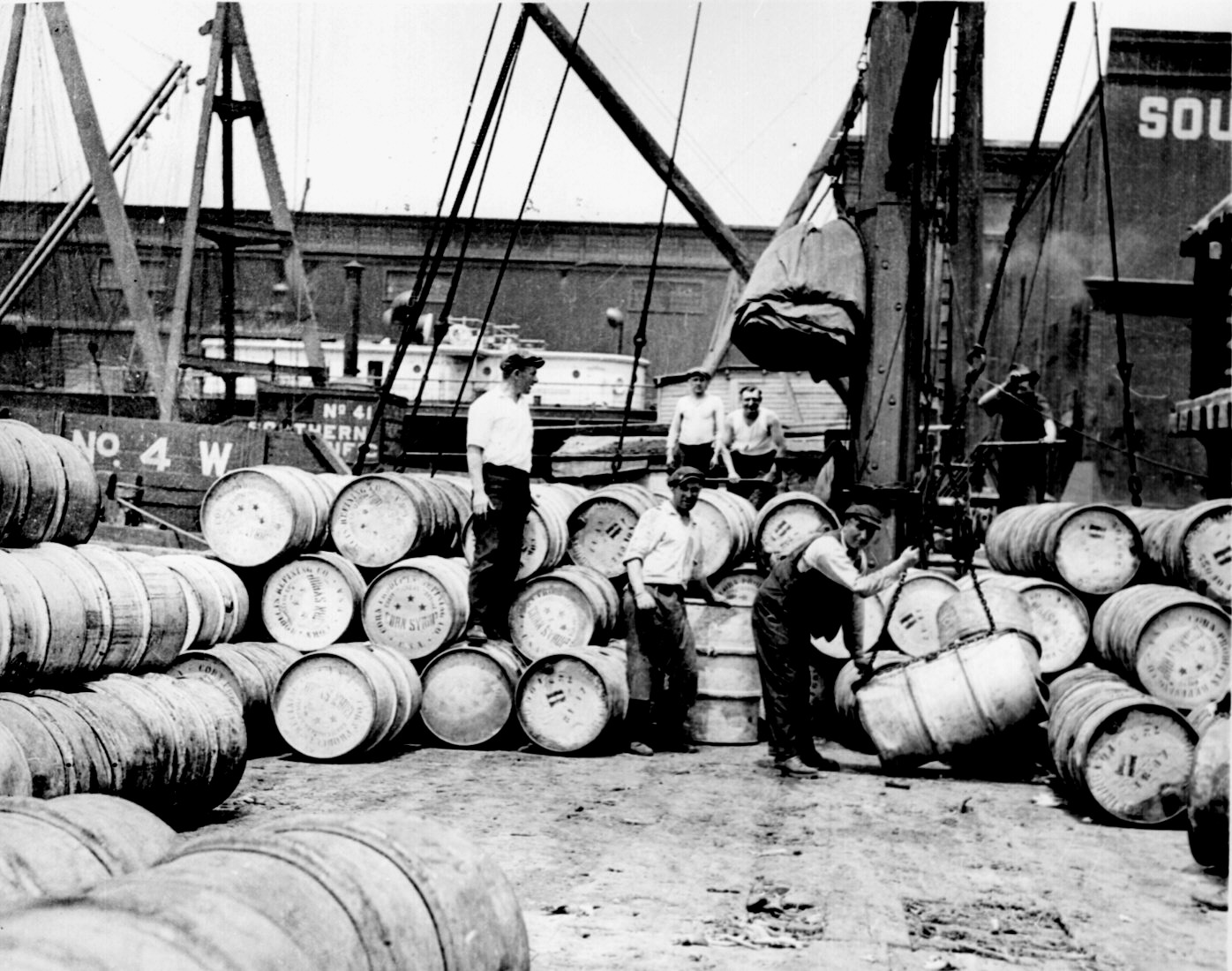
- Court: House of Lords
- Full case name: Scruttons Ltd v Midland Silicones Ltd
- Decided: 6 December 1961
- Citations: [1962] AC 446; [1961] UKHL 4

Court membership
- Judges sitting: Viscount Simonds; Lord Reid; Lord Keith of Avonholm; Lord Denning; Lord Morris of Borth-y-Gest

Keywords
- Privity of contract, bill of lading, agency

Scruttons Ltd v Midland Silicones Ltd [1961] UKHL 4, [1962] AC 446 is a leading House of Lords case on privity of contract. It was a test case in which it was sought to establish a basis upon which stevedores could claim the protection of exceptions and limitations contained in a bill of lading contract to which they were not party. The Court outlined an exception to the privity rule, known as the Lord Reid test, through agency as it applies to sub-contractors and employees seeking protection in their employers' contract.

== Facts ==
Scruttons Ltd was shipping a load of crates through a carrier. In the contract between the two parties there was a limitation of liability clause for $500 (£179) per box. The goods were damaged in transit due to the negligence of the stevedores. The stevedores were under contract with the shipping company which contained an exclusion clause. Midland were unaware of the relationship between the carriers and the stevedores.

== Judgment ==
At first blush, it was clear to the Court that the stevedores could not be exempted by the exemption clause as there was no privity of contract. The Court looked at whether there was a bailment relationship but found none. The case turned on the application of the Elder, Dempster case which suggested that privity could be circumvented. Lord Reid proposed that the stevedores could be covered under the contractual clause through agency if certain pre-conditions were satisfied.

I can see a possibility of success of the agency argument if (first) the bill of lading makes it clear that the stevedore is intended to be protected by the provisions in it which limit liability, (secondly) the bill of lading makes it clear that the carrier, in addition to contracting for these provisions on his own behalf, is also contracting as agent for the stevedore that these provisions should apply to the stevedore, (thirdly) the carrier has authority from the stevedore to do that, or perhaps later ratification by the stevedore would suffice, and (fourthly) that any difficulties about consideration moving from the stevedore were overcome. And then to affect the consignee it would be necessary to show that the provisions of the Bills of Lading Act 1855 apply.

All of Lord Reid's preconditions were satisfied in the subsequent case of New Zealand Shipping v Satterthwaite (The Eurymedon) [1975] AC 154.

The Scruttons case followed an earlier case with similar reasoning, Adler v Dickson (The Himalaya).

== Significance ==
With the Scruttons case, the issue of third party rights in a contract was made certain. There had been much speculation on the meaning of Elder, Dempster but it became clear that there was no new rule from that case. This case, among others, resulted in the change of practice in shipping contracts by adding Himalaya clauses to protect third parties.

== Subsequent law ==
The Contracts (Rights of Third Parties) Act 1999 replaced much of the common law on privity.

== See also ==
- Privity
- Privity in English law
- Third party beneficiary
