= List of ordinances of the Legislative Council of Western Australia from 1856 =

This is a list of ordinances of the Legislative Council of Western Australia for the year 1856.

== 1856 ==
Short title, or popular name	Citation	Royal assent
Long title
Real Property Transfer Act Amendment Ordinance 1856	19 Vict. No. 3	9 June 1856
An Ordinance for declaring valid certain Instruments and Transactions affecting Titles to Lands in Western Australia, and for amending the Ordinance 2 William IV., No. 7. (Note: Real Property Transfer Act 1832 (2 Will. IV. No. 7))
	19 Vict. No. 4	9 June 1856
An Ordinance to abolish the franking of Letters and Packets.
Lands Alienation Ordinance 1856	19 Vict. No. 5	9 June 1856
An Ordinance to empower the Governor to alienate Lands in Western Australia purchased out of Imperial or Colonial Funds.
	19 Vict. No. 6	9 June 1856
An Ordinance to enable "The Total Abstinence Society" in Western Australia to raise a sum of £300 on their Land.
	19 Vict. No. 7	9 June 1856
An Ordinance to naturalize Charles Millar
	19 Vict. No. 8	9 June 1856
An Ordinance to substitute other punishment in lieu of Transportation.
	19 Vict. No. 9	9 June 1856
An Ordinance to repeal "The Small Savings Ordinance," (Note: Small Savings Ordinance 1855 (18 Vict. No. 3)) No. 3, 1855 (18 Vic., No. 3).
	19 Vict. No. 10	9 June 1856
An Ordinance to facilitate Inquiries in the nature of Coroners' Inquests.
	19 Vict. No. 11	12 June 1856
An Ordinance to amend and consolidate the Laws affecting the Solemnization of Marriage in the Colony of Western Australia.
	19 Vict. No. 12	12 June 1856
An Ordinance for the better Registration of Births, Deaths, and Marriages in the Colony of Western Australia.
	19 Vict. No. 13	12 June 1856
An Ordinance for the Relief of Creditors against Persons Removing from one Australasian Colony to another.
Registration of Deeds Act 1856	19 Vict. No. 14	14 June 1856
An Ordinance to consolidate and amend the Laws relating to the Registration of Deeds, Wills, Judgments and Conveyances affecting Real Property.
	19 Vict. No. 15	16 June 1856
An Ordinance to consolidate and amend the Laws respecting the licensing of Boats and Boatmen.
	19 Vict. No. 16	19 June 1856
An Ordinance to repeal an Ordinance passed in the 17th year of the reign of Her present Majesty, No, 14, (Note: 17 Vict. No. 14) imposing Duties on imported Goods, and to make other provisions in lieu thereof. (Repealed by Tariff Act 1871 (34 Vict. No. 17))
Public House Ordinance 1856	20 Vict. No. 1	21 June 1856
An Ordinance for consolidating and amending the Laws relating to the licensing of Public Houses, and for further regulating the sale and consumption of fermented and spirituous liquors in the Colony of Western Australia; and also for extending the powers of Justices with. respect to drunkenness.
	20 Vict. No. 2	21 June 1856
An Ordinance to consolidate and amend the Laws relating to the sale of spirituous and fermented Liquors.
	20 Vict. No. 3	23 June 1856
An Ordinance to provide for the payment of certain unforeseen Expenses in the Year One thousand eight hundred and fifty-six; and also to provide for the appropriation of the Revenue for the Year One thousand eight hundred and fifty-seven.
	20 Vict. No. 4	23 June 1856
An Ordinance to provide for an excess of Expenditure in the Year One thousand eight hundred and fifty-five over and above the Estimates for the same.
Larceny Summary Conviction Ordinance 1856	20 Vict. No. 5	30 June 1856
An Ordinance for the more speedy Trial and Punishment of Offences in certain cases of Larceny.
	20 Vict. No. 6	15 October 1856
An Ordinance to provide for the payment of certain unforeseen Expenses in the Year One Thousand Eight hundred and Fifty-six.
Imperial Act Adopting Ordinance 1856	20 Vict. No. 7	16 October 1856
An Ordinance for adopting and applying an Act of Parliament, intituled "An Act to amend the Law relating to Bills of Lading," (Note: Bills of Lading Act 1855 (18 & 19 Vict. c. 111 (Imp))) in the administration of justice in the Colony of Western Australia.
	20 Vict. No. 8	16 October 1856
An Ordinance to empower the Governor of Western Australia to purchase certain certificates of remission in the price of Crown Lands.
	20 Vict. No. 9	6 November 1856
An Ordinance to enlarge the remedies of Creditors against the persons of their Debtors.
Insolvent Ordinance 1856	20 Vict. No. 10	6 November 1856
An Ordinance for giving relief to Insolvent Persons, and providing for the due collection, administration, and distribution of Insolvent Estates in Western Australia, and for the prevention of frauds affecting the same.

== Sources ==
- "legislation.wa.gov.au".
