= DHL International (NZ) Ltd v Richmond Ltd =

- Court: Court of Appeal of New Zealand
- Full case name: DHL International (NZ) Limited v Richmond Limited
- Decided: 1993
- Citation: [1993] 3 NZLR 10

Court membership
- Judges sitting: Richardson J, Hardie Boys J, Gault J

Keywords
- exclusion clause

DHL International (NZ) Ltd v Richmond Ltd [1993] 3 NZLR 10 is a leading case in New Zealand case law allowing exclusion of liability clauses even for fundamental breach. It effectively incorporates the English case of Photo Production Ltd v Securicor Transport Ltd [1980] AC 827 into New Zealand case law.

== Background ==
Richmond arranged for DHL to courier some shipping documents relating to the sale of leather worth US$57,460 to a company called Bini in Italy, for which they were charged the modest courier fee of $22.50. Richmond declined DHL's offer to purchase insurance for direct loss, nor purchase similar insurance from elsewhere insurance consequential loss.

Richmond also accepted DHL's standard terms of limiting its liability for direct losses to $100, and a total exclusion of liability for consequential loss.

In order to ensure that Richmond got paid for the leather, they arranged for the documents to couriered to a bank in Italy and not to Bini directly.

Unfortunately, for reasons unknown, these shipping documents were couriered directly to Bini. It was never ascertained just why this happened, but the judge suggested that as the delivery address was handwritten and hard to read, it was possible that the courier opened it and got Bini's address in error.

This unfortunately allowed Bini to uplift the leather shipment from the port without first paying. Bini subsequently went into liquidation without making payment.

Richmond sued DHL for the substantial consequential loss that resulted. DHL claimed they were not liable for damages due to their exclusion of liability clause.

== Held ==
The Court of Appeal ruled that as Richmond had taken the business risk for such a loss by electing not to purchase insurance for consequential loss, and that the exemption clause here was perfectly valid.
