= Deviation (law) =

The doctrine of deviation is a particular aspect of contracting for the carriage of goods by sea. A deviation is a departure from the "agreed route" or the "usual route", and it can amount to a serious breach of contract.

The consequences of unjustified deviation can be very grave for the carrier, who is thereby prevented from relying upon exclusion clauses within the contract limiting his liability; nor will the carrier be able to rely on statutory protections, such as Article IV of the Hague-Visby Rules.

== The scope of deviation ==
The "agreed route" is identified from the contract of carriage, as evidenced by the bill of lading. The ports of origin and destination (e.g. "Piraeus to Liverpool"') define the route. The "usual route" is not necessarily the shortest route, but is a version of the agreed route, taking into account safety issues, distances, seasonal conditions and war zones. For instance, the route "Auckland to London" could be via Suez, Panama, the Cape of Good Hope, or Cape Horn, but the usual route will be identified by reference to current practice or to any previous dealings of the parties.

Although a deviation is primarily a departure from the agreed route or the usual route, the concept of deviation extends beyond this. Deviation may include any unjustified delay such as remaining at authorised ports longer than necessary, or acting beyond the agreed scope of the voyage. For example, if a ship makes an authorized call at a port, but stays on to trade or break bulk, this action may amount to a deviation.

The concept of deviation has been extended (called "quasi deviation") to cover wrongful transhipment, careless stowage, and stowage in the wrong part of the ship (such as on deck, rather than below decks). The consequences of quasi-deviation are the same as for ordinary deviation.

Article IV Rule 4 of the Hague-Visby Rules provides: "Any deviation in saving or attempting to save life or property at sea or any reasonable deviation shall not be deemed to be an infringement or breach of these Rules or of the contract of carriage, and the carrier shall not be liable for any loss or damage resulting therefrom". The Hague-Visby Rules do not define deviation, but rely on existing common law definitions. Nor do the Rules define "any reasonable deviation", but in decided cases the phrase has been taken to include deviation.....

1. to avoid foul weather,
2. to join a convoy,
3. to avoid capture or detention,
4. to take stricken passengers or crew for medical attention,
5. to effect necessary repairs, (though this may be evidence of unseaworthiness),
6. mutiny of the crew.

If a justified deviation is followed by an unjustified deviation, the doctrine of deviation will apply from the unjustified deviation.

== Establishing the doctrine ==
Deviation in carriage of goods by sea is treated as a serious breach because it undermines the carrier's prime duty to the shipper of the cargo, namely to carry the cargo to its destination with "all due despatch".

The English common law of deviation is established by two cases, Glynn v Margetson and Leduc v Ward.

In Glynn v Margetson (1893), a vessel was to carry a perishable consignment of Seville marmalade oranges from Malaga to Liverpool. The contract included a "liberty clause" which allowed the vessel "liberty to proceed and stay at any ports in any rotation in the Mediterranean, Levant, Black sea or Adriatic, or on the coasts of Africa, Spain, Portugal or France.." On leaving Malaga, the vessel did not head straight for Liverpool, but made her way to Burriana, 350 miles up the coast. As a result of the delay, the cargo had deteriorated by the time it reached England. The House of Lords (establishing the so-called "main purpose rule"), held that the clause, if given full effect, would defeat the main purpose of the contract and would be, in effect, an exemption clause which should be ignored. They gave the clause a limited construction, namely that the vessel could have liberty to proceed and stay only at ports reasonably close to the agreed route from Malaga to Liverpool, such as Cadiz or Lisbon.

In Leduc v Ward (1882), a vessel was to voyage from Fiume (modern day Rijeka) to Dunkirk. The bill of lading gave "liberty to call at any ports in any order". She did not proceed to Dunkirk, but headed for Glasgow, and was lost in a storm near Ailsa Craig. Just as in Glynn v Margetson, the Court of Appeal held that the deviation was unjustifiable and was not permitted by the liberty clause, so the carrier was liable for the lost cargo. (Had the court held that the deviation was justified, the carrier would have avoided liability as the storm would have been an "Act of God"). Even though it was accepted that the shipper had been verbally informed that the vessel might make passage to Glasgow, this evidence was not admissible, because the parol evidence rule prevents recourse to extraneous evidence when construing a written document. Using the criteria of differential bargaining strength of the parties, whereby the carrier is usually deemed to have greater bargaining power than the shipper, note that the parol evidence rule may be relaxed if a shipper seeks to rely on any verbal promises of the carrier (rather than vice versa, as in Leduc v Ward) .

== The consequences of deviation ==
An unjustified deviation is by nature a serious breach of the contract of carriage, and the carrier will be prevented from relying upon any exclusion clause which limits his liability. Such clauses include the "liberty clauses" of Leduc v Ward, but in particular include the huge range of exemptions granted to carriers by Article IV of the Hague-Visby Rules.

=== Extending the scope of the rule ===
Although a shipping case, the "Main Purpose Rule" within Glynn v Margetson for a time became the basis of the common law of exemption clauses in English contract law, as shown in the case of Karsales v Wallis. Here, a comprehensive and well-drafted exemption clause could not protect a car dealer who had supplied a used Buick with its cylinder head adrift. The court held that the contract was to supply a car ("a vehicle capable of self-propulsion"), so the Buick was not a "car", and the seller could not rely on a clause when there was "breach of a fundamental obligation". (Note that "breach of a fundamental obligation" seems little more than a rewording of Glynn v Margetson's "breach of the main purpose").

However, the English law of contract has progressed beyond the Karsales case. The definitive statements of the common law of contract are the Suisse Atlantique and Photo Productions v Securicor These two cases provide that in the event of really serious breach, or fundamental breach, whether or not an exemption clause is effective is a question of construction, not of law; so that exemption clauses may not be automatically be ignored after a fundamental breach. The common law approach has been to some extent superseded by statutory provisions, such as the Unfair Contract Terms Act 1977, as amended by the Consumer Rights Act 2015. However, although the general law of contract has "moved on", the strict rule of Glynn v Margetson is, for the time being, still central to the law of deviation.

== Insurance issues ==
When goods are carried by sea, they are effectively insured twice. First, prudent cargo-owners (shippers or consignees) will insure their cargo, and, secondly, carriers (shipowners) will have cover for third-party liability from their P&I Club. If the carrier is responsible for causing loss or damage, the P&I Club will pay; but if the carrier can avoid liability, say, via an exemption clause or via Article IV of the Hague-Visby Rules, the cargo-owner will have to make a claim on his own insurance.

If an unjustified deviation occurs, the voyage has changed, and the insurer may be discharged from subsequent liability. Under the policy, the insurer accepts only the agreed risks. A crucial policy requirement is that the ship shall proceed to her port of destination by the shortest and safest route (or usual route), and not to make any unjustified deviation.

An unjustifiable deviation does not necessarily avoid the policy, but it may cancel any liability of the underwriters for any loss incurred after the time of the deviation; but the insurer remains bound to indemnify any losses sustained prior to the deviation. Although the insurer is discharged from subsequent responsibility, he is normally entitled to retain the whole premium.

== See also ==
- Fundamental breach
- Deviation in building contracts
- Carriage of Goods By Sea Act 1971
- Seaworthiness (law)
- Incoterms
- Cargo
