= Norwich City Council v Harvey =

Norwich City Council v Harvey is a 1989 English law case on the waiver of liability in negligence.

== Facts ==
After inviting tenders, the plaintiff, Norwich CC, engaged a contractor to build an extension to their swimming pool complex.

Clause 20A in the contract declared that the works were at the sole risk of Norwich CC, as regards loss or damage by fire; and that Norwich CC would arrange adequate insurance cover against those risks. Presumably Norwich CC wanted to ensure that the insurance was "in their own hands", and it also meant that the contractors could exclude insurance costings from their tender.

The contractor engaged a sub-contractor to carry out felting work on the new roof. An employee of the subcontractor used a blow-torch carelessly and set fire to both the existing buildings and the new extension, causing extensive damage. Norwich CC's insurer was reluctant to bear the cost of the loss, arguing that the negligent party should be liable instead.

== Decision ==
Although the subcontractor was indeed negligent, being in breach of the duty of care established in Donoghue v Stevenson 1921, the Court of Appeal held that it was clearly intended that the employer should bear the whole risk of damage by fire, including fire caused by the negligence of the contractor or of any subcontractors, especially as the contractors had responded to Clause 20A by omitting insurance costings in their tenders.

Clause 20A was thus effectively a waiver saying that in the event of fire damage Norwich CC (rather than other parties) would be deemed liable for any loss; so Norwich CC was estopped from claiming otherwise.

== See also ==
- Junior Books Ltd v Veitchi Co Ltd
- Unfair Contract Terms Act 1977
- Intention to create legal relations
- Bailment
