= Junior Books Ltd v Veitchi Co Ltd =

UK legal case

- Citation: [1983] 1 AC 520
- Transcript: judgment

Junior Books Ltd v Veitchi Co Ltd [1983] 1 AC 520 was a House of Lords judgment on whether a duty of care in delict exists between a contractor or sub-contractor and an employer.

This Scottish case initially caused some excitement amongst English academic lawyers who thought it heralded the fusion of contract and tort into a single "law of obligations". Although textbooks were written with such a title, the idea did not generally catch on, and Junior Books has since become "a very distinguished case".

== Facts ==
Veitchi was a specialist flooring company which was nominated as a subcontractor to lay flooring at Junior Books' factory. The floor proved defective but as there was a contract only between Junior Books and the main contractor, there was no contractual relationship whereby Junior Books could sue Veitchi, the subcontractor. Accordingly, Junior Books was obliged to bring an action in delict, arguing that Veitchi owed Junior Books a non-contractual duty of care.

It was not explained why Junior Books did not sue the main contractor in contract.

== Judgment ==
The House of Lords ruled that there was a sufficient degree of proximity between the parties to allow Junior Books to sue in delict.

The decision was not followed by the House of Lords in D & F Estates Ltd v Church Commissioners for England [1989] AC 177, where Junior Books was described as a "unique" case which could not be regarded as laying down any principle of general application.

== See also ==
- Pure economic loss in English Law
- Delict
- Norwich City Council v Harvey 1989 1 WLR 828
