= NZ Shipping Co Ltd v A M Satterthwaite & Co Ltd =

1974 decision of the Judicial Committee of the Privy Council

The Eurymedon
- Court: Privy Council
- Citations: [1974] UKPC 1, [1975] AC 154
- Transcript: PC ruling

Court membership
- Judges sitting: Lord Wilberforce, Lord Hodson, Viscount Dilhorne, Lord Simon of Glaisdale, Lord Salmon

Case opinions
- Lord Reid

Keywords
- Privity, consideration, third parties

New Zealand Shipping Co. Ltd. v. A. M. Satterthwaite & Co. Ltd., or The Eurymedon (/jʊəˈrɪmədɒn/) is a leading case on contract law by the Judicial Committee of the Privy Council. This 1974 case establishes the conditions when a third party may seek the protection of an exclusion clause in a contract between two parties.

== Facts ==
A drilling machine was to be shipped from Liverpool to Wellington, New Zealand. The bill of lading stipulated the limited liability of the carrier. It further stated that the clause would extend to servants, agents, and any independent contractors, which is often referred to as a "Himalaya clause". The carrier company was a subsidiary of the company that also owned the stevedore operation that unloaded the drill. Due to negligence the stevedores damaged the drill while unloading it. The stevedores claimed protection of the immunity clause in the contract between the carrier and Satterthwaite.

== Judgment ==
This case had facts on all fours with the earlier House of Lords' case, Scruttons Ltd v Midland Silicones Ltd, where their lordships held that the doctrine of privity prevented the stevedore from relying on a limitation of liability clause in a bill of lading. However, in that case Lord Reid proposed that in future such stevedores might be covered under the contractual clause through agency provided certain pre-conditions were satisfied:

I can see a possibility of success of the agency argument if (first) the bill of lading makes it clear that the stevedore is intended to be protected by the provisions in it which limit liability, (secondly) the bill of lading makes it clear that the carrier, in addition to contracting for these provisions on his own behalf, is also contracting as agent for the stevedore that these provisions should apply to the stevedore, (thirdly) the carrier has authority from the stevedore to do that, or perhaps later ratification by the stevedore would suffice, and (fourthly) that any difficulties about consideration moving from the stevedore were overcome. And then to affect the consignee it would be necessary to show that the provisions of the Bills of Lading Act 1855 apply.

In this case, the Privy Council considered that all four aspects of the "Lord Reid test" had been met, so that the stevedores were fully protected under the damage exclusion clause. Also, it used the concept of implied agency to give effect to the exemption (Himalaya) clause (thus extending it from the carriers to the stevedores) using the carriers as the agent.

Although the contract of carriage (as evidenced by the bill of lading) was bilateral, the bill of lading operated as a unilateral contract between the shippers and the stevedores; and this unilateral contract was activated by performance (unloading of the drill), and the stevedore was then entitled to rely upon the protections within the bill of lading.

Lord Wilberforce stated:

the Bill of Lading brought into existence a bargain initially unilateral but capable of becoming mutual, between the shippers and the appellants (NZ Shipping Co Ltd), made through the carrier as agent. This became a full contract when the appellant performed services by discharging the goods. The performance of these services for the benefit of the shipper was the consideration for the agreement by the shipper that the appellant should have the benefit of the exemptions and limitations contained in the Bill of Lading.

He went on to say:

in their Lordships' opinion, consideration may quite well be provided by the appellant, as suggested, even though (or if) it was already under an obligation to discharge to the carrier ... An agreement to do an act which the promisor is under an existing obligation to a third party to do, may quite well amount to valid consideration and does so in the present case: the promisee obtains the benefit of a direct obligation which he can enforce. This proposition is illustrated and supported by Scotson v Pegg (1861) 6 H & N 295 which their Lordship consider to be good law.

== See also ==
- English contract law
- Privity
- Privity in English law
- Third party beneficiary
- Carlill v Carbolic Smoke Ball Co
- Pao On v Lau Yiu Long
- Harvela Investments Ltd v Royal Trust of Canada (CI) Ltd
