= Hurd's bank =

Region off the shore of Malta

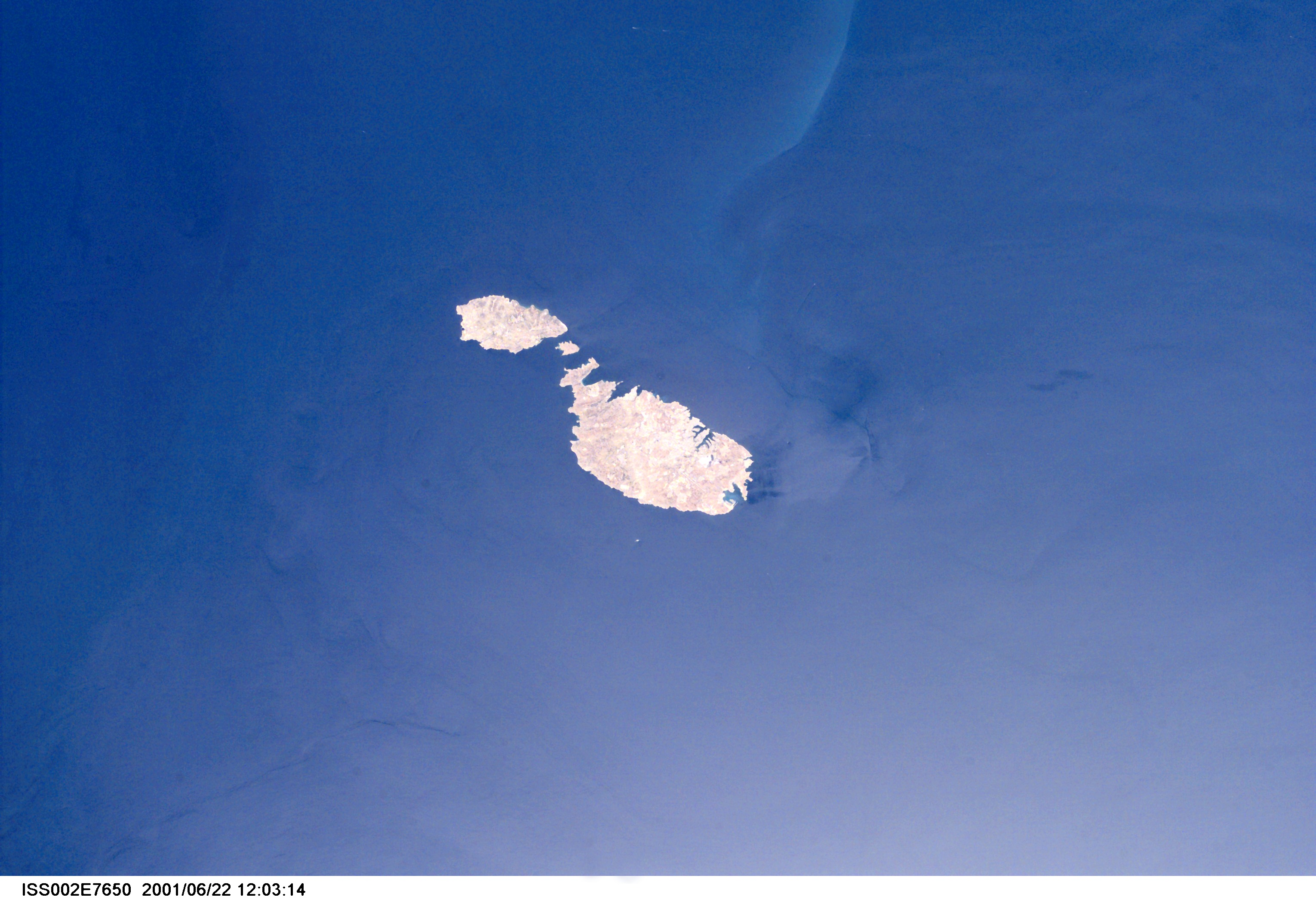
Hurd's bank is to the right on this View of Malta

Hurd's bank is a region offshore the eastern tip of the island of Malta. It is known to be a bunkering area where cargo ships drop anchor and take on supplies.

== History ==
As early as 2010 the Maltese government disclaimed authority over the tankers that used Hurd's bank for shelter.

In December 2016 Hurd's bank was remarked to the only free offshore anchorage in Europe.

In December 2016 Hurd's Bank was seen as a waypoint for those involved in the "slow-burning civil war of Libya" to profit from the sale of Libyan government-subsidized fuel obtained in the Port of Zwara.

In 2017 Hurd's bank was said by a Libyan government minister to be used "by Maltese mafia" to "smuggl[e].. Libyan fuels".

In 2018 Hurd's Bank was said to be a "paradiso dei trafficanti".

In June 2019 the Maltese government of Joseph Muscat was considering to dump construction waste in Hurd's Bank.

In August 2019 Hurd's bank was noticed because of Russian STS transfers of oil for sanctions-hit Venezuela. The Venezuelans needed chemicals from Russia with which to dilute their Heavy crude oil. According to an observer, upwards of 400,000 tonnes of Russian petroleum distillates are reported to have been transferred via ship-to-ship (STS) operations over the period from January to June 2019. The light distillates, for example naptha, are mixed with the heavy crude oil to dilute it. A total of 13 tankers were involved in the statistics. Another shipment of vacuum gasoil (VGO) was remarked. The Russian Port of Tuapse on the Black Sea was usually the origin of the Venezuelan STS operations.

In June 2020 Xinhuanet showed a people smuggling vessel in Hurd's Bank, to depict the fact that the Maltese government had closed its ports due to the COVID-19 hysteria.

In 2020 the US Embassy in Libya remarked on the use of Hurd's bank for illicit shipment of fuel and illicit drugs from Libya, and sanctioned several individuals and vessels.

In March 2022 the area was rumoured to be a fertile ground for offshore wind farms.

In May 2022 Finance minister Clyde Caruana said that the government would claim 900 square kilometres at Hurd's bank as part of its EEZ and government announced its intention to issue "concessions to private companies for the production of offshore wind energy, the production and storage of hydrogen, fish farms and the establishment of artificial islands."

In June 2022 cocaine was noted as one of the substances that transited Hurd's Bank.

In October 2022 a lifeless human body was found floating in Hurd's bank.

A June 2024 study showed Hurd's bank to be the probable location of ship-to-ship transfers of Russian-origin oil. The destination of the particular shipment was some undisclosed African country.
