= Shipbuilding contract =

Shipbuilding contract, which is the contract for the complete construction of a ship, concerns the sales of future goods, so the property could not pass title at the time when the contract is concluded. The aim of shipbuilding contract is to regulate a substantial and complex project which the builders and buyers assume long-term obligations to other and bear significant commercial risks.

Shipbuilding contract is a non-maritime contract and not within the Admiralty jurisdiction because it is insufficiently related to any rights and duties pertaining to sea commerce and/or navigation. The property passes to the buyer when the ship has been completed. To avoid difficulties, provision can be made for the property to pass in stage in the process of development and construction. It is different from most hire-purchase agreements where the seller has ownership of the property until the payment of the final installment.

Under the Sale of Goods Act 1979, this kind of agreement to sell ‘future’ goods may be a sale either by description or by sample. The sale of new building ship, which is large manufacturing project, is obviously undertaken by description. It is a condition to comply with the agreed description when performing the contract.

== Standard forms of contract ==
Shipbuilding contract are constructed within the framework of standard contract forms amended by the contractual parties to meet their particular requirements. The choice of form will be based on the influence of trade association which the builders belong to.

Principal Form

- SAJ Form
  It is published by the Shipbuilders’ Association of Japan in January 1974 and the framework of this form is commonly used in South Korea, China, Singapore and Taiwan.
- AWES Form
  It is the standard shipbuilding contract of the Association of European Shipbuilders and Shiprepairers which revised and reissued in May 1999.

National Form

- The Norwegian Shipowners’ Association and Norwegian Shipbuilders’ Association
- MARAD Form (The Maritime Administration of the United States Department of Commerce)
  It is used in relation to American newbuildings financed under Federal Ship Financing Program authorized by Title XI of the Merchant Marine Act 1936.

== Formation of contract ==
There is no requirement that a shipbuilding contract should be concluded in writing, it will be also legally enforceable in oral provided that necessary formal elements are present. The main terms of an agreement, such as expenditure, timescale and risks involved in shipbuilding, are better to record in written form.

In order to create an enforceable agreement, the essential elements for an agreement to form a legally binding contract must be presented, they are:

- offer
- acceptance
- consideration
- privity of contract
- intention to form a contract
- capacity

Where all these elements are present, a legally binding contract comes into effect. Otherwise, if any of the elements are missing, there is no legally binding contract.

== Duties of a builder ==
The duty of a builder is to complete the new building ship in accordance with the design and specification given by the buyer. He must ensure the materials he uses are fit for the purpose required and must carry out the building works with general standard of skills expected for a shipbuilder since the buyers rely on the builder’s skills and judgment when contract is being performed. He should also comply with the safety requirement laid down in the Merchant Shipping Act.

== Passing of risk ==
Within the shipbuilding contract, the risk does not pass from builder to buyer until delivery of the completed ship. It is suggested that builder should take out an insurance cover before the delivery of ship.

== Builder's remedies ==
If the buyer cannot fulfill the payment, the builder may:

- exercise his possessory lien
- resell as a result, exercising his lien
- exercise a common law right of stoppage in transit
- sue for the price

The buyer may want to exit from the contract due to change in market situation or financial situation. When the builder had made use of his contractual remedy to cancel the contract for the future, the buyer’s default indeed will trigger the guarantor’s liability and make the letter of guarantee operative. Moreover, if the buyer fails to take delivery, the builder may sue him for failure to accept. The builder has remedies available when the buyer breaches the contract.

== Buyer's remedies ==
If the builder fail to deliver the ship, the buyer may:

- seek specific performance
- sue for non-delivery

There may be an express term in the contract that the property is to pass in whole or partly by stages to buyer before delivery, this does not mean that the buyer has the right to reject the ship if it fails to meet up with the required standard.

The buyer has the right to examine the complete property before he is obliged to signify acceptance. He has no right to reject after accepting the delivery, but only to redress if he discovers fault is by way of damage.

The builder must notify the buyer the ship’s readiness for trials which will be taken place at the agreed place of delivery. The buyer may choose any place to take the delivery and the costs are for his account.

The time of delivery is normally stated and treated as an essential term of the contract. If it is not mentioned or it is not an essential term, the builder should deliver the completed ship within a reasonable time. “Reasonable” will be determined case by case.

== Summary ==
Shipbuilding contract is different from the general sales contract in terms of nature of contract, time frame and passing of risks. Each shipbuilding contract is tailor made where there are different requirement from each buyer.

Shipbuilding contract needs very careful drafting of provisions in contemplation of the likely event of damage before completion.

== See also ==
- Seaworthiness (law)
