= Carriage of Goods by Sea Act 1971 =

Act of the Parliament of the United Kingdom

Carriage of Goods by Sea Act 1971 (Note: Section 6(1).)
- Act of Parliament
- Parliament of the United Kingdom
- Long title: An Act to amend the law with respect to the carriage of goods by sea.
- Citation: 1971 c. 19
- Territorial extent: United Kingdom (Note: Section 6(2).)

Dates
- Royal assent: 8 April 1971
- Commencement: 23 June 1977 (Note: Section 6(5). The Carriage of Goods by Sea Act 1971 (Commencement) Order 1977.)
Other legislation
| Amends | Nuclear Installations Act 1965; Hovercraft Act 1968 |
| Repeals/revokes | Carriage of Goods by Sea Act 1924 |
| Amended by | Interpretation Act 1978; Merchant Shipping Act 1981; Statute Law (Repeals) Act 1989; Merchant Shipping Act 1995 |
| Relates to | Carriage of Goods by Sea Act 1992 |

Status: Amended

Text of statute as originally enacted

Revised text of statute as amended

Text of the Carriage of Goods by Sea Act 1971 as in force today (including any amendments) within the United Kingdom, from legislation.gov.uk.

The Carriage of Goods by Sea Act 1971 (c. 19) is an act of the Parliament of the United Kingdom. It incorporates into English Law the Hague-Visby Rules which are to be found as the Schedule to the act. The act does not use the term "Hague-Visby Rules" as such; instead, the Rules are referred to in that act as the "Hague Rules As Amended".

Under Article X, the Rules apply if:

(a) the bill of lading is issued in a contracting State, or
(b) the carriage is from a port in a contracting State, or
(c) the contract (of carriage) provides that (the) Rules ... are to govern the contract".

If the Rules apply, the entire text of Rules is incorporated into the contract of carriage as a "statutory contract", and any attempt to exclude the Rules is void under Article III (8).

Section 3 of the act provides that there is no strict (or absolute) duty to provide a seaworthy ship. Under the Rules, the carrier must merely exercise due diligence, before and at the start of the voyage, to provide a seaworthy ship.

The Hague-Visby Rules were amended by a protocol in 1979, but not all signatories to the Rules have adopted the amendments.

== Additional UK provisions ==
Although Article I(c) of the Rules exempts live animals and deck cargo, section 1(7) of the act permits parties to opt in to the Rules when the goods in the bill of lading are deck cargo or live animals. In which case, Article I(c) will be read as if it did not exist.

Also, although Article III(4) declares a bill of lading to be a mere prima facie evidence of the receipt by the carrier of the goods", section 4 of the Carriage of Goods by Sea Act 1992 upgrades a bill of lading to be "conclusive evidence of receipt", thereby annulling the decision in Grant v Norway 1851.

== Note ==
The Contracts (Rights of Third Parties) Act 1999 does NOT apply to contracts for the carriage of goods by sea.

== See also ==
- Law of Carriage of Goods by Sea
- Seaworthiness (law)
- Himalaya clause
