= Suisse Atlantique Societe d'Armament SA v NV Rotterdamsche Kolen Centrale =

Suisse Atlantique case
- Court: House of Lords
- Citation: [1967] 1 AC 361

Suisse Atlantique Societe d'Armament SA v NV Rotterdamsche Kolen Centrale [1967] 1 AC 361 is a landmark English contract law decision of the House of Lords, concerning the notions of fundamental breach of contract and inequality of bargaining power.

It was subsequently upheld by another House of Lords case, Photoproductions v Securicor, and together these two cases form the definitive statement of the common law prior to the Unfair Contract Terms Act 1977.

== Facts ==
The case involved a two-year time charter to export coal from Europe to the USA. The ship was to make as many trips as possible, and the owners were to be paid an agreed freight rate according to the amount of cargo carried. If the laytime (Note: "Laytime" is the allowable period for the charterer to arrange loading and unloading) were exceeded, the charterers were to pay demurrage of $1000 per day. Serious delays occurred because the charterers had difficulty both in getting cargo to the port, and in loading and unloading efficiently. Nevertheless, the shipowner did not cancel the contract, but allowed the charter to continue for the remainder of the two years. In all, only eight round trips were made, whereas the owners claimed that, without delays, a further six trips were feasible. The total demurrage payable amounted to only $150,000. The owners sued for damages, saying their claim should not be limited to the demurrage amount because the charterer's gross delays amounted to a fundamental breach of the contract.

(To explain the financial background: from the charterer's point of view, it may have been economically more efficient to delay loading and unloading, and deliberately act in breach of the contract rather than to carry it out by making more voyages, because, after the contract had been made, the re-opening of the Suez Canal had led to a fall in freight rates).

== Judgment ==
The owners claimed that the delays were so great as to constitute a fundamental breach of the charterparty. They argued that the $1000 per day demurrage was so derisory that the term amounted to an exclusion clause denying the shipowner appropriate compensation; and further, that the case of Karsales Ltd v Wallis meant that in the event of a fundamental breach, the law automatically denied such protection of any exclusion clauses.

The House of Lords observed that since the charterparty did not prescribe a minimum number of voyages, there was no inherent breach by the charterers undertaking only 8 voyages rather than the 17 that the owners claimed were possible. Rather, if the delays meant that the charterer had exceeded laytime, then demurrage would be payable; and since the demurrage clause plainly showed that the parties had contemplated the possibility of delay, it followed that the delays did not amount to fundamental breach. (Nevertheless, the demurrage clause was in effect a limitation clause restricting the ability of the shipowner to claim actual losses).

The court added that Karsales v Wallis had overstated the law, and that whether or not a fundamental breach extinguishes any protection that the defendant might rely on was a "question of construction" and not a "question of law". Therefore, the shipowners were entitled only to claim charterparty demurrage of $1000 per day, not full compensation for their actual loss.

== Commentary ==
In his judgment, Lord Reid said of the charterparty terms, “In the ordinary way the customer has no time to read them, and if he did read them he would probably not understand them. And if he did understand and object to any of them, he would generally be told he could take it or leave it. And if he then went to another supplier the result would be the same. Freedom to contract must surely imply some choice or room for bargaining.” It was plain from Lord Reid's comments that he viewed the shipowners to be the stronger contractual party, so that neither law nor equity could come to their aid once they had prescribed demurrage terms that were insufficient. (Note: In other cases before the Court of Appeal, Master of the Rolls Lord Denning had emphasised the significance of "inequality of bargaining power" in English contract law.)

Their Lordships distinguished this case from "deviation" cases, such as Glynn v Margetson, and Leduc v Ward. (Note: Deviation occurs when a carrier departs from the agreed route or the usual route. The carrier's conduct thereby also "departs" from the purpose of the contract contemplated by the parties, with the effect that the carrier could not rely on the protection of any term limiting liability (whether the limitation provision was an express contract term, or one arising from, say, Article IV of the Hague-Visby Rules.)

After the Suisse Atlantique decision, there was a series of cases where the Court of Appeal patently ignored the findings of this case. One such case was Harbutt's "Plasticine" Ltd v Wayne Tank and Pump Co Ltd. The House of Lords was less than amused, and in the Photo Productions case they emphatically reaffirmed the principles of the Suisse Atlantique.

== See also ==
- Efficient breach
- Deviation (law)
- Fundamental breach
- Charterparty
