= Karsales (Harrow) Ltd v Wallis =

English Court of Appeal decision

- Court: Court of Appeal of England and Wales
- Full case name: Karsales (Harrow) Ltd. v. Frank Ernest Wallis
- Decided: June 12, 1956
- Citation: [1956] EWCA Civ 4

Court membership
- Judges sitting: Lord Denning, Lord Birkett, Lord Parker

Case opinions
- Decision by: Lord Denning

Keywords
- Contract law; Fundamental breach; Contract interpretation

Karsales (Harrow) Ltd v Wallis [1956] EWCA Civ 4 is an English Court of Appeal decision which established fundamental breach as a major English contract law doctrine. Denning LJ MR gave the leading judgment replacing the Rule of Strict Construction, which require a literal approach to the construction of contract terms.

The Karsales decision allowed a court to override exemption clauses in contracts, if it appears that such clauses undermined the "fundamental obligations" of the parties. Although the case was the leading case for a decade, it has since lost much of its significance.

== Facts ==
Mr. Wallis viewed a used Buick car that was being sold by Stinton for £600. Wallis found the car to be in excellent condition, and agreed that he would buy the car if Stinton would arrange financing through a hire-purchase company. Karsales (Harrow) Ltd. bought the car and sold it to Mutual Finance Ltd., which then finally supplied the car to Wallis on hire-purchase terms. Wallis had not seen the vehicle since his first viewing.

The car was delivered not at the dealership, but instead was towed at night to the customer's house. The following morning, Wallis inspected the car and found it to be in a substantially different state than it was when he first saw the vehicle: the bumper was being held on by a rope, the new tires had been replaced by old ones, the radio was missing, as were chrome body trim strips. The car would not run, because the cylinder head (with bent and burnt valves) was lying loose upon the engine block. Wallis refused to pay for the car since it was not in the same condition as when he agreed to make the purchase.

== Judgment ==
=== Trial ===
Karsales sued Wallis for the remaining payments on the vehicle. Karsales relied on an exclusion clause in their contract, which stated that

"No condition or warranty that the vehicle is roadworthy or as to its age, condition or fitness for any purpose is given by the owner or implied herein."

The trial judge held that this clause did allow Karsales to recover the remaining costs from Wallis, and entered a judgment against him.

=== Court of Appeal ===
On appeal, Denning LJ reversed the trial judge's decision. He said the following.

Under a hire-purchase agreement of this kind, when the hirer has himself previously seen and examined the motor car and made an application for hire-purchase on the basis of the inspection of it, there is an obligation on the lender to the deliver the car in substantially the same condition as when it was seen.

The Court added that despite the comprehensively-worded exemption clause in the contract, the dealer was nevertheless liable, as fundamentally this was a contract to sell "a car, a vehicle capable of self-propulsion"; so accordingly this Buick was "not a car".

== Significance ==
=== The "fundamental breach" doctrine ===
Denning LJ established a new precedent by declaring this a fundamental breach: that is, a breach that goes to the root of the contract, where the breach is so severe that there cannot be a contract after this breach. This decision set the precedent that goes against the strict construction rule. In strict construction, the rule is that the contract is intended to do what it says it will do, and that judges can only apply what the contract says within its own terms. Since the contract has been agreed upon by both parties, the contract is seen as representing both parties' interests. However, Denning ruled against this rule since it would not be fair for the consumer.

=== The doctrine challenged ===
Karsales v Wallis' concept of "fundamental breach" (aka "breach of a fundamental obligation) was essentially a restatement of the "Main Purpose Rule" established in Glynn v Margetson [1893] A.C. 351, the leading case on deviation in carriage of goods by sea. While the Main Purpose Rule still holds good in maritime law, it was deemed too wide for the general law of contract. The 1967 House of Lords decision of the Suisse Atlantique held that whether or not the breach was "fundamental" was not a matter of LAW but a question of CONSTRUCTION; that is, exemption clauses might apply if the court's interpretation of the facts was that the exemption clause was not inappropriate.

Despite some reluctance by Lord Denning to absorb the new ruling in Photo Production v Securicor 1980, the House of Lords upheld and approved its earlier decision, thereby signalling the decline of the doctrine of "fundamental breach"

=== Unfair Contract Terms Act 1977 ===
The Suisse Atlantique and Photo Production cases together represent the final authoritative statements of the common law on fundamental breach prior to the enactment of the Unfair Contract Terms Act 1977. The Act provides that some contract terms are VOID (such as limiting liability for causing death or injury through negligence), while others are "Valid only insofar as they are reasonable". "Reasonableness" was defined in the Act, which also provided some examples of reasonable and unreasonable terms. The Unfair Contract Terms Act 1977 was amended by the Consumer Rights Act 2015.
