= Himalaya clause =

Contractual provision for the benefit of a third party

A Himalaya clause is a contractual provision expressed to be for the benefit of a third party who is not a party to the contract. Although theoretically applicable to any form of contract, most of the jurisprudence relating to Himalaya clauses relate to maritime matters, and exclusion clauses in bills of lading for the benefit of employees, crew, and agents, stevedores in particular.

== The Himalaya case ==
The clause takes its name from a decision of the English Court of Appeal in the case of Adler v Dickson (The Himalaya) [1954]. The claimant, Mrs Adler, was a passenger on a voyage on the SS Himalaya. At the port of Trieste, she was injured when a gangway came adrift, throwing her onto the quayside, 18 feet below. The passenger ticket contained non-responsibility clauses exempting the carrier, as follows:

Passengers and their baggage are carried at the passenger's entire risk ...

The company will not be responsible for and shall be exempt from all liability respect of any ... damage or injury whatsoever of or to the person of any passenger ...

Being unable to sue the steamship company in contract, Mrs Adler instead sued the master of the ship and the bosun in negligence. The defendants sought to rely on the protection of the exclusion clauses on the passenger's ticket; but Mrs Adler argued that under the doctrine of privity of contract, the defendants could not rely on the terms of a contract to which they were not party.

The Court of Appeal declared that in the carriage of passengers (as well as in the carriage of goods) the law does permit a carrier to stipulate not only for himself, but also for those whom he engaged to carry out the contract, adding that the stipulation might be express or implied. On the particular facts, the court held that the defendants could not take advantage of the exception clause as the passenger ticket passed no benefit to servants or agents, neither expressly nor by implication.

As a consequence of this decision, specially drafted Himalaya clauses benefiting stevedores and others began to be included in bills of lading.

As the negligent master and bosun were employees acting in the course and scope of their employment, their employer would have been vicariously liable. Although the case does not specifically discuss vicarious liability, Denning LJ stated, "the steamship company say that, as good employers, they will stand behind the master and boatswain and meet any damages and costs that may be awarded against them".

Although the decision in The Himalaya is clear and unambiguous, the reasoning (ratio decidendi) underpinning the case is still the subject of some debate. The courts at various times have suggested that the exception to the common law rules of privity of contract may be founded upon "public policy" reasoning, the law of agency, trust arrangements, or (with respect to goods) by the law of bailment rather than the law of contracts.

== Legal developments since Adler v Dickson ==
The decision is now accepted as settled law in most common law countries, having been upheld several times by the Judicial Committee of the Privy Council.

The Himalaya decision itself has been partly superseded by legislation in the United Kingdom on two fronts:

- Under s.2(1) of the Unfair Contract Terms Act 1977, it is no longer possible to limit liability for personal injury or death caused by negligence;
- Under the Contracts (Rights of Third Parties) Act 1999, section 6, contracts may confer benefits upon third parties, in a wider form than under the decision in the Himalaya.
- Although the Contracts (Rights of Third Parties) Act 1999 does NOT apply to contracts for carriage of goods by sea (in order to avoid conflict with the Carriage of Goods by Sea Act 1971), the 1999 Act does permit the giving to a third party the benefit of an exclusion or limitation clause in the contract.

The following cases reveal how English common law has progressed since Adler v Dickson:

- Scruttons v Midland Silicones [1962] AC 446: The House of Lords applied the Privity Rule to prevent a negligent stevedore from relying on a limitation clause in the bill of lading.
- N.Z. Shipping v Satterthwaite (The Eurymedon) [1975] AC 154: The Privy Council found that enough had been done to allow a negligent stevedore to rely on such a limitation clause.
- Port Jackson Stevedoring v Salmond, The New York Star [1980] 3 All ER 257 PC developed the law further.
- The Mahkutai [1996] AC 650, 664–5, where Lord Goff opined that it was "perhaps inevitable" that there should develop "a fully-fledged exception to the doctrine of privity of contract".
- Houtimport v Agrosin, The Starsin [2003] 1 Lloyd's Rep 571 also developed the law further.

== The United States ==
The decision of the English courts has been generally accepted and adopted throughout the Commonwealth. In the United States, which has always had a more circumspect view of the rules of privity of contract, has generally been accommodating to exceptions to the principle, and the decision in Herd v Krawill 359 US 297 [1959], Lloyd’s Rep 305, is generally taken to uphold them provided (as in other legal systems) certain criteria are adhered to.

== Sample Himalaya clause ==
"It is hereby expressly agreed that no servant or agent of the carrier (including every independent contractor from time to time employed by the carrier) shall in any circumstances whatsoever be under any liability whatsoever to the shipper, consignee or owner of the goods or to any holder of this Bill of Lading for any loss, damage or delay of whatsoever kind arising or resulting directly or indirectly from any act, neglect or default on his part while acting in the course of or in connection with his employment and, without prejudice to the generality of the foregoing provisions of this clause, every exemption, limitation, condition and liberty herein contained and every right, exemption from liability, defense and immunity of whatsoever nature applicable to the carrier or to which the carrier is entitled hereunder shall also be available and shall extend to protect every such servant or agent of the carrier acting as aforesaid and for the purpose of all the foregoing provisions of this clause the carrier is or shall be deemed to be acting as agent or trustee on behalf of and for the benefit of all persons who are or might be his servants or agents from time to time (including independent contractors as aforesaid) and all such persons shall to this extent be or be deemed to be parties to the contract in or evidenced by this Bill of Lading."
