= Seaworthiness (law) =

Assurance that a vessel can make a voyage

Seaworthiness refers to the assurance that a vessel is seaworthy, meaning that it is properly equipped and sufficiently maintained to survive the risks incident to a voyage. In the context of marine insurance, unless otherwise stated, it is an implied condition of an policy of insurance that the vessel is seaworthy.

Within the context of other maritime contracts, a carrier of goods by sea owes a duty to a shipper of cargo that the vessel is seaworthy at the start of the voyage; a shipowner warrants to a charterer that the vessel under charter is seaworthy; and a shipbuilder warrants that the vessel under construction will be seaworthy when completed.

== Statutory seaworthiness – criminal liability ==
The Merchant Shipping Act 1995 makes it a criminal offence to send or attempt to send an unseaworthy ship to sea. Seaworthiness in this context relates to defective structures, equipment, under-manning, overloading etc. and the vessel may be detained. In every contract of employment at sea there is an implied obligation on the owner to ensure the seaworthiness of the ship and an allegation of unseaworthiness may be brought by the crew, though at least five members of the crew are required to bring the action.

== Seaworthiness in Marine Insurance ==
Under Section 39 of the Marine Insurance Act 1906, in a voyage policy there is an implied warranty that the vessel is "reasonably seaworthy in all respects":

S. 39 (1) In a voyage policy there is an implied warranty that at the commencement of the voyage the ship shall be seaworthy for the purpose of the particular adventure insured. (2 )Where the policy attaches while the ship is in port, there is also an implied warranty that she shall, at the commencement of the risk, be reasonably fit to encounter the ordinary perils of the port. (3) Where the policy relates to a voyage which is performed in different stages, during which the ship requires different kinds of or further preparation or equipment, there is an implied warranty that at the commencement of each stage the ship is seaworthy in respect of such preparation or equipment for the purposes of that stage. (4) A ship is deemed to be seaworthy when she is reasonably fit in all respects to encounter the ordinary perils of the seas of the adventure insured. (5) In a time policy there is no implied warranty that the ship shall be seaworthy at any stage of the adventure, but where, with the privity of the assured, the ship is sent to sea in an unseaworthy state, the insurer is not liable for any loss attributable to unseaworthiness.

== Seaworthiness in Carriage of Goods by Sea ==
=== At common law ===
At common law, when goods are carried by sea by a “common carrier” (a public carrier), then, if the contract of carriage does not contain an exception clause relating to seaworthiness, there is an absolute undertaking that the vessel is seaworthy. Liability is “strict”**, meaning the carrier is liable even in the absence of negligence, as in Liver Alkali v Johnson. This does not mean the vessel need be capable of encountering any peril. The test of seaworthiness may be "that the ship should be in a condition to encounter whatever perils of the sea a ship of that kind, and laden in that way, may be fairly expected to encounter in the voyage to be performed". However, the strict liability at common law is invariably modified in contracts of affreightment. In charter parties the shipowner may negotiate an express clause excluding his liability for unseaworthiness or he may, as it more usual, agree to incorporate the provisions of the Carriage of Goods by Sea Act 1971 into the charter.

=== By statute ===
Article III Rule 1 of the Hague-Visby Rules provides: "The carrier shall be bound before and at the beginning of the voyage to exercise due diligence to— (a) Make the ship seaworthy. (b) Properly man, equip and supply the ship. (c) Make the holds, refrigerating and cool chambers, and all other parts of the ship in which goods are carried, fit and safe for their reception, carriage and preservation.

Section 3 of the Carriage of Goods by Sea Act 1971 adds: " There shall not be implied in any contract for the carriage of goods by sea to which the Rules apply by virtue of this Act any absolute undertaking by the carrier of the goods to provide a seaworthy ship." This provision makes it clear that there is no strict liability to provide a seaworthy ship.

McFadden v Blue Star Line (1905) provides that: "A vessel must have that degree of fitness which an ordinary careful and prudent owner would require his vessel to have at the commencement of her voyage having regard to all the probable circumstances of it…Would a prudent owner have required that it (i.e. the defect) should be made good before sending his ship to sea, had he known of it? If he would, the ship was not seaworthy…"

Together with the Hague Visby Rules, the common law provides that the concept of "seaworthiness" covers: the ship, its equipment and supplies, the crew, the vessel's suitability for the particular cargo and its suitability for the particular voyage or for particular ports.

The Rotterdam Rules, which are intended to replace the Hague Rules, Hague-Visby Rules and Hamburg Rules, are many years away from ratification. If and when the Rotterdam Rules come into force, the carrier will have to maintain seaworthiness throughout the voyage, not just at the start. Presumably the standard of seaworthiness at sea would be somewhat lower than when in port (where refit facilities are available).

== Seaworthiness in Chartering ==
A shipowner will normally owe the following duties to the charterer:

1. To provide a seaworthy ship which complies with the charterparty description;
2. To properly and carefully load, handle, stow, carry, keep, care for, discharge and deliver the cargo;
3. To comply with charterers’ legitimate employment instructions;
4. To prosecute voyages with reasonable dispatch.

In Hong Kong Fir Shipping Co Ltd v Kawasaki Kisen Kaisha, the ship's unsatisfactory team of engineers meant that the vessel was unseaworthy, and the consequent delay in delivery amounted to serious deviation. However, in a controversial judgment, the court held that the charterer could not cancel and was entitled only to damages, since neither breach denied the claimant of the main benefit of the contract.

== Seaworthiness in Shipbuilding Contracts ==
Shipbuilding contracts will normally be effected using a standard form contract. However, the common law "business efficacy rule" in The Moorcock may require that seaworthiness is an implied term of the contract. Also, sections 13 & 14 of the Sale of Goods Act 1979 require (respectively) that "the goods", (the ship), "comply with description" and shall be of "satisfactory quality".

== See also ==
- Seakeeping
- Carriage of Goods By Sea Act 1971
