= Carriage of goods by sea =

Body of maritime law

The law of carriage of goods by sea is the body of law that governs the rights and duties of shippers, carriers and consignees of marine cargo. Primarily concerned with cargo claims, this body of law combines the international commercial law, the law of the sea and admiralty laws.

== Terminology ==
The law of carriage of goods by sea involves its own specific legal terminology:

- Charterparty: The charterparty is a contract between the charterer of a ship and the ship owner for the use of the ship.
  - There are three kinds of charterparties: voyage, time, and demise (or bareboat).
    - Voyage and time charterparties are similar except in how payment is calculated. Both involve the use of the ship and the employment of a ship’s crew. This contrasts with the demise charterparty, in that:
      - the ship remains in the control of the owner’s crew;
      - the carrier of goods is the owner, that is, the owner is obliged to transport the goods as specified;
      - and the contract is essentially for services.
    - In a demise charterparty, the charterer of the ship:
      - employs their own crew;
      - is regarded as the carrier of goods, that is, being legally responsible for the transportation of goods;
      - and contracts for the right to use the ship.
  - Bill of lading: The bill of lading is a legal document that performs a number of functions. Whereas the charterparty is a contract for the use of the ship, and may or may not involve the carriage of goods, the bill of lading is a contract for the carriage of goods itself.
    - First, the bill of lading records transactions of cargo and the arrangement of carriage. It is evidence of the contract of carriage.
    - Second, the bill of lading is a transferable contract in United Kingdom law.
    - Third, the bill of lading represents the goods and is a document of title. The holder of the bill of lading is generally the cargo owner.
    - Fourth, the bill of lading is usually issued after the cargo has been “laden” or loaded onto the ship. It is a receipt for the goods.

== History ==
While there is evidence of the existence of receipts for goods loaded aboard merchant vessels stretching back as far as Roman times, the practice of recording cargo aboard ship in the ship's log is almost as long-lived as shipping itself. The modern bill of lading only came into use with the growth of international trade in the medieval world.

The growth of mercantilism (which produced other financial innovations such as the charterparty or carta partita, the bill of exchange and the insurance policy) produced a requirement for a title document that could be traded in much the same way as the goods themselves. It was this new avenue of trade that produced the bill of lading in much the same format as currently used.

== Duties ==
The typical obligations of a carrier by sea due to a shipper of cargo are:

- to provide a seaworthy ship
- to issue a bill of lading
- to "properly and carefully load, handle, stow, carry, keep, care for, and discharge the goods carried".
- to proceed with "reasonable despatch", and
- to follow an agreed route (and not to deviate from it).

== Cargo claims ==
Consignees (or indeed any lawful holder of the bill of lading) who wishes to make a cargo claim because their goods are substandard or have been lost or damaged at sea, typically have four options:

- They may sue the seller, the shipper, or the carrier; or they may claim from their own insurance policy.
- A suit will lie against the seller if the seller has insufficient title, or the goods are not of satisfactory quality, or do not comply with sample or description.
- A suit will lie against the shipper if the goods are damaged through insufficient packing, or if any loss is suffered through insufficient labelling.
- A suit will lie against the carrier if the damage occurred aboard ship. The carrier's P&I Club cover will normally bear the cost.
- If the cargo is damaged where the shipper without fault (e.g. if the goods have been properly packed and stowed) or if the carrier is either blameless or exempted from liability (e.g. because of 'Act of God' or 'Justifiable Deviation'), a cargo-owner will have to claim on his own cargo policy.

A claim having been paid, the assured's rights of claim will be subrogated to the insurer, who may consider proceeding against a party who has caused the damage.

A shipowner may sue a time-charterer or voyage-charterer in the event of breach of contract. For instance, if the charterer exceeds laytime, demurrage will have to be paid; and if the charterer cannot comply with a Notice of Readiness (NOR), the shipowner may repudiate (cancel) the contract of carriage and claim damages for any loss.

== Carriage conventions ==
In most contracts of carriage the carrier has greater bargaining power than the shipper, and in the 19th century English judges developed rules to protect the weaker parties. Beginning with the Hague Rules, the various conventions set out to codify and develop such common law principles by providing an international set of basic standards to be met by the carrier, with a view to establishing a universal framework of legal rights and duties. In practice, however, the level of protection was actually reduced because of new provisions allowing the carrier to (i) limit his liability, and (ii) rely on a wide array of exemptions from liability Also, whereas up until about 1885, the carrier's duties were deemed to be strict, by 1905 the duty became one of "reasonable care" or "due diligence" only.

The Hague Rules of 1924 effectively codified, albeit in a diluted form, the English common law rules to protect the cargo owner against exploitation by the carrier. Nearly 50 years later, the Hague-Visby "update" made few changes, so that the newer Rules still applied only to "tackle to tackle" carriage (i.e. carriage by sea) and the container revolution of the 1950s was virtually ignored. The Hague-Visby Rules both excluded cabotage carriage, and declared that deck cargo and live animals were not to be considered as "goods" (although the Carriage of Goods by Sea Act 1971 provided that cabotage, deck cargo and live animals are to be covered in English contracts).

The enormous list of exemptions to liability in Article IV made the Rules seem biased in favour of the carrier. As a result, The United Nations produced its own Hamburg Rules which were both more modern and fairer to cargo-owners; but while these have been enthusiastically adopted by developing nations, the wealthier ship-owning nations have stuck to Hague-Visby. In 2008 the final text of the Rotterdam Rules was agreed at UNCITRAL. These Rules are very extensive, with over 90 Articles against 11 in Hague-Visby. Although the Rotterdam Rules are up-to-date and address multimodal carriage, they have, nine years later, yet to be in force. It now seems doubtful that the Rotterdam Rules will ever be adopted, but there is a slim possibility that a cut-down version of the Rules ("Rotterdam Lite") might find favour.

China has effectively adopted the Hague Rules. The USA, which tends to shun conventions and instead rely on homespun legislation, has its own statutes. These comprise the Carriage of Goods by Sea Act (a mildly updated version of the Hague Rules for goods in foreign commerce), and the Harter Act (for mostly domestic carriage).

== Relevant statutes and sources ==
- Carriage of Goods by Sea Act 1971 - UK
- Carriage of Goods by Sea Act 1992 - UK
- Carriage of Goods by Sea Act - (USA)
- Harter Act - USA
