= English law =

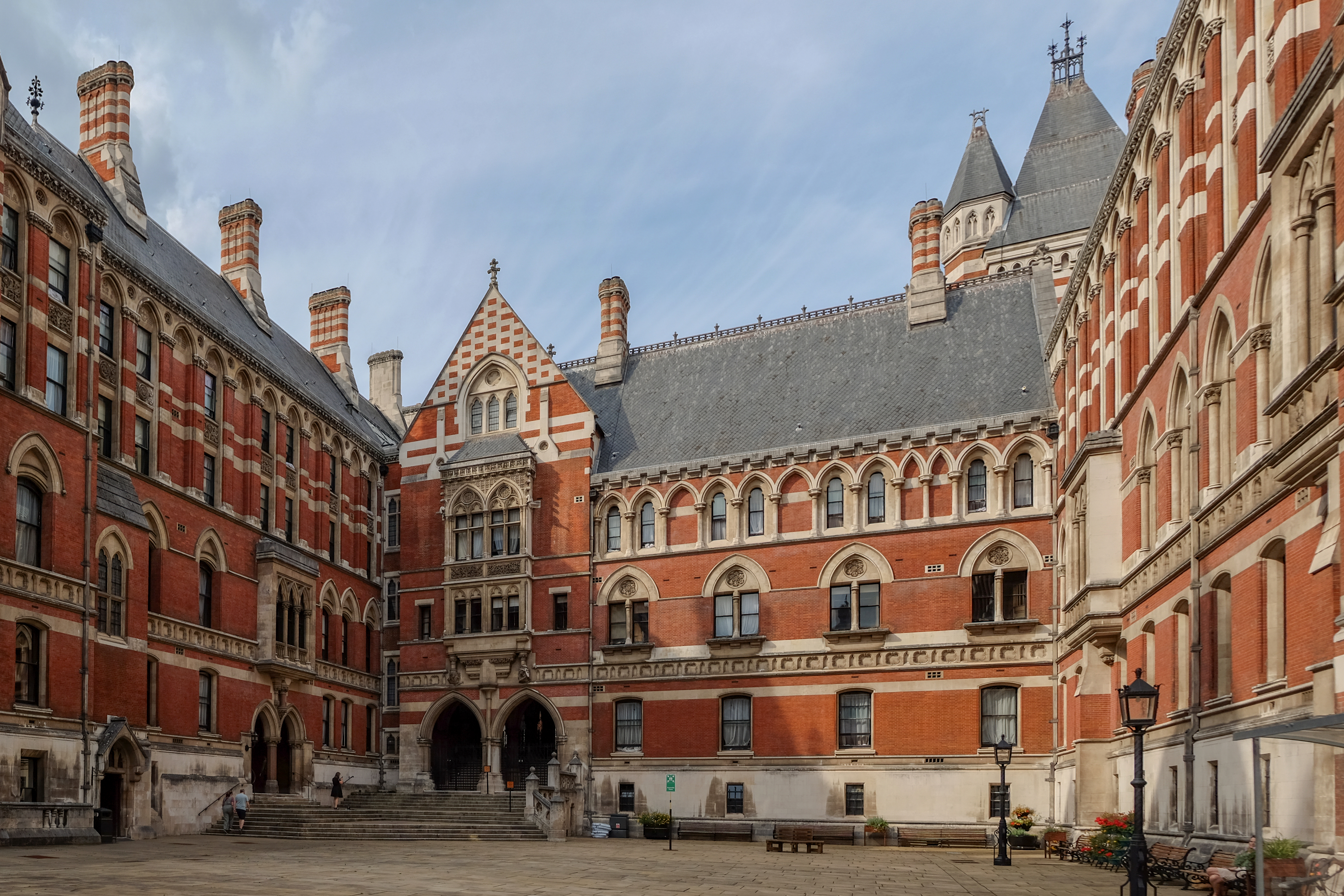
The Royal Courts of Justice is on the Strand in London. Together with its adjacent Thomas More Building and its outpost Rolls Building on Fetter Lane, it is the main seat of the High Court of Justice and the ordinary seat of the Court of Appeal.

English law is the common law legal system of England and Wales, comprising mainly criminal law and civil law, each branch having its own courts and procedures. The judiciary is independent, and legal principles like fairness, equality before the law, and the right to a fair trial are foundational to the system.

== Principal elements ==
Although the common law has, historically, been the foundation and prime source of English law, the most authoritative law is statutory legislation, which comprises Acts of Parliament, regulations (Note: English regulations are not to be confused with EU Regulations) and by-laws. In the absence of any statutory law, the common law with its principle of stare decisis forms the residual source of law, based on judicial decisions, custom, and usage.

Common law is made by sitting judges who apply both statutory law and established principles, which are derived from the reasoning from earlier decisions. Equity is the other historic source of judge-made law. Common law can be amended or repealed by Parliament. (Note: The old estates in land were replaced by new provisions in the 1925 property legislation)

Not being a civil law system, it has no comprehensive codification. (Note: Two areas of commercial law, sale of goods and marine insurance, were codified into (respectively) the Sale of Goods Act 1893 and the Marine Insurance Act 1906.) However, most of its criminal law has been codified from its common law origins, in the interests both of certainty and of ease of prosecution. For the time being, murder remains a common law crime, rather than a statutory offence. (Note: In contentious cases, such as the battered wife's revenge, or family mercy killings, English juries have been glad of the ability to treat a clear murder as though it were manslaughter.)

Although Scotland and Northern Ireland form part of the United Kingdom and share Westminster as a primary legislature, they have separate legal systems outside English law.

International treaties such as the European Union's Treaty of Rome (Note: Now renamed as Treaty on the Functioning of the European Union) or the Hague-Visby Rules have effect in English law only when adopted and ratified by Act of Parliament. Adopted treaties may be subsequently denounced by executive action, unless the denouncement or withdraw would affect rights enacted by Parliament. In this case, executive action cannot be used owing to the doctrine of parliamentary sovereignty. This principle was established in the case of R (Miller) v Secretary of State for Exiting the European Union in 2017.

== Legal terminology ==
=== Criminal law and civil law ===
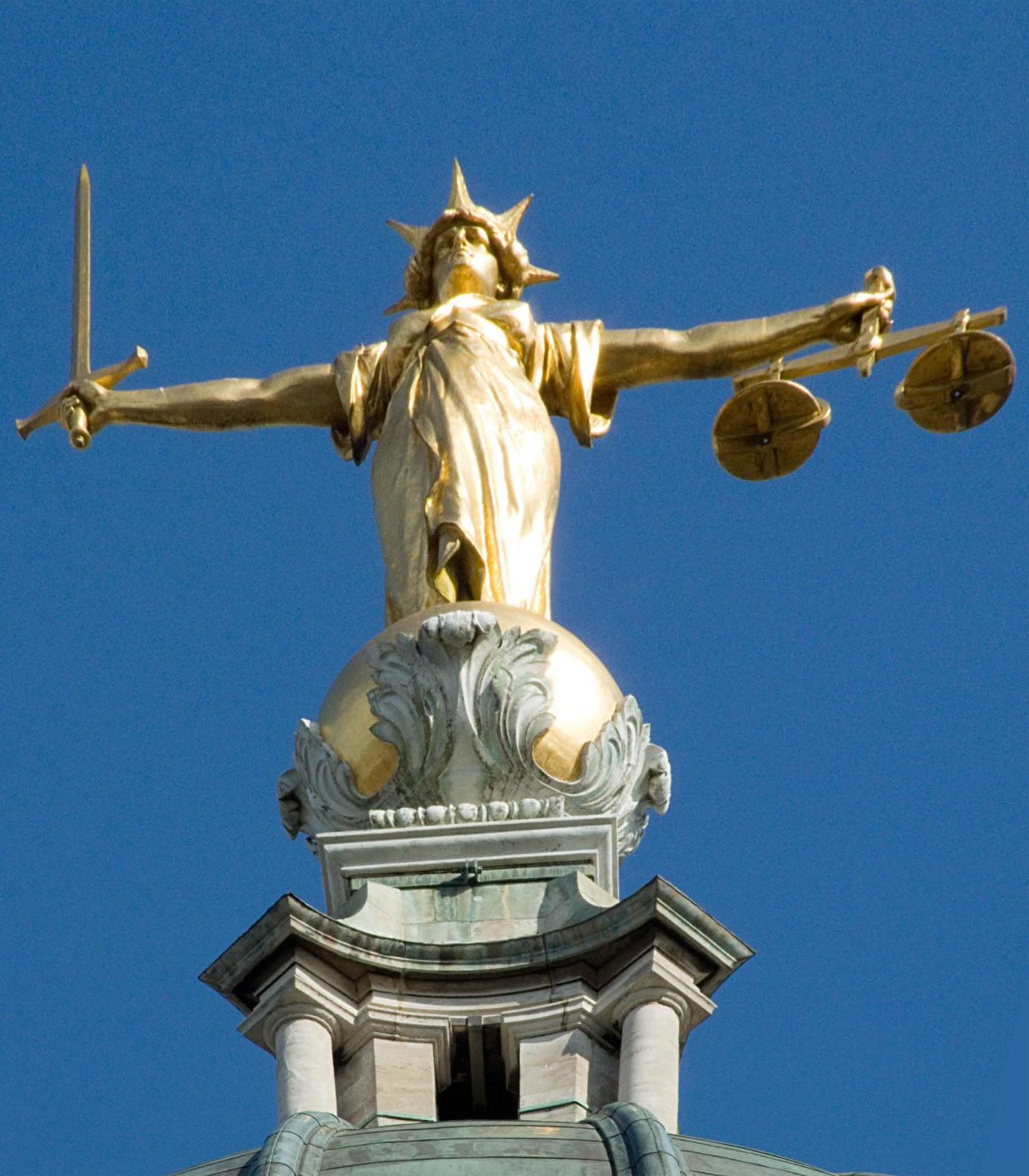
Statue of Lady Justice on the dome of the Central Criminal Court of England and Wales in the City of London (the "Old Bailey")

Criminal law is the law of crime and punishment whereby the Crown prosecutes the accused. Civil law is concerned with tort, contract, families, companies and so on. Civil law courts operate to provide a party (Note: ... or "claimant", "plaintiff", "petitioner" etc.) who has an enforceable claim against another party with a remedy such as damages or a declaration.

=== Common law and civil law ===
In this context, civil law is the system of codified law that is prevalent in the rest of Europe. Civil law is founded on the ideas of Roman law. (Note: An example of civil law is the Napoleonic Code in France)

By contrast, English law is the archetypal common law jurisdiction, built upon case law.

=== Common law and equity ===
In this context, "common law" means the judge-made law of the King's Bench; whereas equity is the judge-made law of the (now-defunct) Court of Chancery. Equity is concerned mainly with trusts and equitable remedies. Equity generally operates in accordance with the principles known as the "maxims of equity". (Note: Equitable maxims include: "Equity will not suffer a wrong to be without a remedy", "Equity acts on the person" and "He who comes into equity must come with clean hands".)

The reforming Judicature Acts of the 1880s amalgamated the courts into one Supreme Court of Judicature which was directed to administer both law and equity. The neo-Gothic Royal Courts of Justice in The Strand, London, were built shortly afterwards to celebrate these reforms.

=== Public law and private law ===
Public law (Note: This distinction is borrowed from civil law systems, and is neither as useful nor as appropriate in England as in Europe.) is the law governing relationships between individuals and the state. Private law encompasses relationships between private individuals and other private entities (but may also cover "private" relationships between the government and private entities).

=== Legal remedies ===
A remedy is "the means given by law for the recovery of a right, or of compensation for its infringement". Most remedies are available only from the court, but some are "self-help" remedies; for instance, a party who lawfully wishes to cancel (Note: Using repudiation or rescission, (as the case may be)) a contract may do so without leave; (Note: If the other party feels that the first was wrong to cancel, he may ask a court to "declare the contract subsisting".) and a person may take his own steps to "abate a private nuisance".

Formerly, most civil actions claiming damages in the High Court were commenced by obtaining a writ issued in the Queen's name. After 1979, writs have merely required the parties to appear, and writs are no longer issued in the name of the Crown. After the Woolf Reforms of 1999, almost all civil actions other than those connected with insolvency are commenced by the completion of a Claim Form as opposed to a writ, originating application, or a summons.

== Sources of English law ==
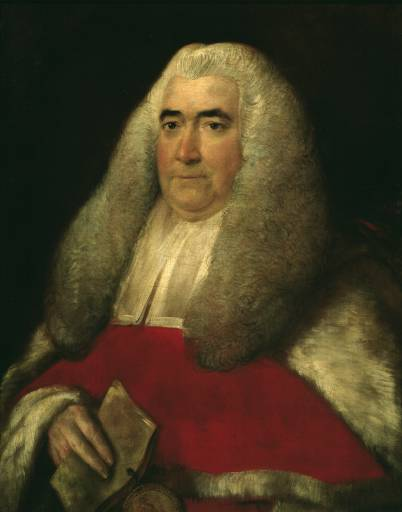
Sir William Blackstone in 1774, after his appointment as a Justice of the Court of King's Bench

In English common law there is a number of sources which are commonly referred to:

- Legislation (primary and secondary)
- The case law rules of common law and equity, derived from precedent decisions
- Parliamentary conventions (Note: Parliamentary conventions should not be confused with international conventions, which are treaties adopted and ratified by Parliament.)
- General customs
- Books of authority (Note: Such as Coke and Blackstone.)

The rule of European Union law in England, previously of prime importance, has been ended as a result of Brexit.

There are also sources which are referred to somewhat less but are still important.

This includes King Alfred in his Domboc (doom book). This documents principles such as mercy, as well as trial by jury, which still exist in English law.

Magna Carta is also considered to be an important sources on law, documenting again the right to trial by jury and the evolution of English law.

According to Lord Justice Laws there is theoretically a distinct set of statutes called constitutional statutes.

== Statute law ==
Primary legislation in the UK may take the following forms:

- Acts of Parliament
- Acts of the Scottish Parliament
- Acts of the Senedd, or previously Acts of the National Assembly for Wales and measures of the National Assembly for Wales
- Statutory rules of the Northern Ireland Assembly

Orders in Council are a sui generis category of legislation.

Secondary (or "delegated") legislation in England includes:

- Statutory instruments and ministerial orders
- By-laws of metropolitan boroughs, county councils, and town councils

Statutes are cited in this fashion: "Short Title Year", e.g. Theft Act 1968. (Note: Before 1963 Acts were cited with a comma between the Short Title and the year, e.g. "Acts of Parliament Numbering and Citation Act, 1962". The comma has since been dropped, e.g. "British Museum Act 1963") This became the usual way to refer to Acts from 1840 onwards; previously Acts were cited by their long title with the regnal year of the parliamentary session when they received royal assent, and the chapter number. For example, the Pleading in English Act 1362 (which required pleadings to be in English and not Law French) was referred to as 36 Edw. 3. c. 15, meaning "36th year of the reign of Edward III, chapter 15". (Note: Although in the past this was all spelled out, together with the long title.) (By contrast, American convention inserts "of", as in "Civil Rights Act of 1964").

== Common law ==
Common law is a term with historical origins in the legal system of England. It denotes, in the first place, the Anglo-Norman legal system that superseded and replaced Anglo-Saxon law in England following the Battle of Hastings in 1066. Throughout the Late Medieval Period, English law was codified through judge-made laws and precedents that were created in the proceedings of Royal justices in the Circuit courts dictated by the Eyres throughout the country (these themselves evolving from the early medieval Itinerant courts). This body of legal scholarship was first published at the end of the 19th century, The History of English Law before the Time of Edward I, in which Pollock and Maitland expanded the work of Coke (17th century) and Blackstone (18th century). Specifically, the law developed in England's Court of Common Pleas and other common law courts, which became also the law of the colonies settled initially under the Crown of England or, later, of the United Kingdom, in United States, Canada, Australia, New Zealand, South Africa, Singapore, Indian subcontinent, Israel and elsewhere.

This law further developed after those courts in England were reorganised by the Supreme Court of Judicature Acts passed in the 1870s. It developed independently, in the legal systems of the United States and other jurisdictions, after their independence from the United Kingdom, before and after the 1870s. The term is used, in the second place, to denote the law developed by those courts, in the same periods, pre-colonial, colonial and post-colonial, as distinct from within the jurisdiction, or former jurisdiction, of other courts in England: the Court of Chancery, the ecclesiastical courts, and the Admiralty court.

In the Oxford English Dictionary (1933) "common law" is described as "The unwritten law of England, administered by the King's courts, which purports to be derived from ancient usage, and is embodied in the older commentaries and the reports of abridged cases", as opposed, in that sense, to statute law, and as distinguished from the equity administered by the Chancery and similar courts, and from other systems such as ecclesiastical law, and admiralty law. For usage in the United States the description is "the body of legal doctrine which is the foundation of the law administered in all states settled from England, and those formed by later settlement or division from them".

=== Early development ===
In 1276, the concept of "time immemorial" often applied in common law, was defined as being any time before 6 July 1189 (i.e. before Richard I's accession to the English throne). Since 1189, English law has been a common law, not a civil law system. In other words, no comprehensive codification of the law has taken place and judicial precedents are binding as opposed to persuasive. This may be a legacy of the Norman Conquest of England in 1066, when a number of legal concepts and institutions from Norman law were introduced to England.

In the early centuries of English common law, the justices and judges were responsible for adapting the system of writs to meet everyday needs, applying a mixture of precedent and common sense to build up a body of internally consistent law. An example is the Law Merchant derived from the "Pie-Powder" Courts, named from a corruption of the French pieds-poudrés ("dusty feet") implying ad hoc marketplace courts.

Following Montesquieu's theory of the "separation of powers", only Parliament has the power to legislate. If a statute is ambiguous, then the courts have exclusive power to decide its true meaning, using the principles of statutory interpretation. Since the courts have no authority to legislate, the "legal fiction" is that they "declare" (rather than "create") the common law. The House of Lords took this "declaratory power" a stage further in DPP v Shaw, where, in creating the new crime of "conspiracy to corrupt public morals", Viscount Simonds claimed the court had a "residual power to protect the moral welfare of the state". As Parliament became ever more established and influential, Parliamentary legislation gradually overtook judicial law-making, such that today's judges are able to innovate only in certain, very narrowly defined areas.

=== Overseas influences ===
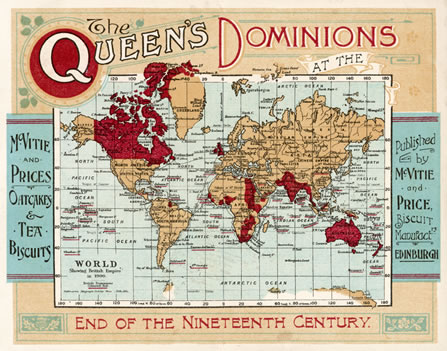
A map of the British Empire under Queen Victoria at the end of the nineteenth century. "Dominions" refers to all territories belonging to the Crown.

==== Reciprocity ====
England exported its common law and statute law to most parts of the British Empire. Many aspects of that system have survived after Independence from British rule, and the influences are often reciprocal. "English law" prior to the American Revolutionary Wars (American War of Independence) is still an influence on American law, and provides the basis for many American legal traditions and principles.

After independence, English common law still exerted influence over American common law – for example, Byrne v Boadle (1863), which first applied the res ipsa loquitur doctrine. Jurisdictions that have kept to the common law may incorporate modern legal developments from England, and English decisions are usually persuasive in such jurisdictions.

In the United States, each state has its own supreme court with final appellate jurisdiction, resulting in the development of state common law. The US Supreme Court has the final say over federal matters. By contrast, in Australia, one national common law exists.

==== Courts of final appeal ====
After Britain's colonial period, jurisdictions that had inherited and adopted England's common law (Note: In this context, "common law" has been described as a body of judge-made law enforced and developed by the courts which includes equity and admiralty law, and which has always been "unintelligible without reference to the statute".) developed their courts of final appeal in differing ways: jurisdictions still under the British crown are subject to the Judicial Committee of the Privy Council in London. (Note: The US, Britain's first colony to be "lost", has a central federal Supreme Court as well as a "supreme court" in each state.) For a long period, the British Dominions used London's Privy Council as their final appeal court, although one by one they eventually established their local supreme court. New Zealand was the last Dominion to abandon the Privy Council, setting up its own Supreme Court in 2004. (Note: Any decisions of the Privy Council made before the change of jurisdiction remain binding legal precedent.)

Even after independence, many former British colonies in the Commonwealth continued to use the Privy Council, as it offered a readily available high-grade service. In particular, several Caribbean Island nations found the Privy Council advantageous.

==== International law and commerce ====
Britain is a dualist in its relationship with international law, so international treaties must be formally ratified by Parliament and incorporated into statute before such supranational laws become binding in the UK. (Note: Mere agreement to the final text of a treaty is only the first stage, hence "dualist". For instance, Britain has yet to ratify the terms of the Arrest Convention 1999, so the earlier 1952 treaty is still in place.) (Note: Ratification after agreement of a final text often takes decades. In the case of the Maritime Labour Convention of 2006, even though the EU instructed member states to adopt the MLC, this "fast-tracked" treaty still did not come into force until 2013.) (Note: For example, the European Convention on Human Rights and Fundamental Freedoms was signed in 1950 and Britain allowed individuals to directly petition the European Commission on Human Rights from 1966. Now s6(1) Human Rights Act 1998 (HRA) makes it unlawful "... for a public authority to act in a way which is incompatible with a convention right", where a "public authority" is any person or body which exercises a public function, expressly including the courts but expressly excluding Parliament.) (Note: Although the European Convention has begun to be applied to the acts of non-state agents, the Human Rights Act (HRA) does not make the convention specifically applicable between private parties. Courts have taken the convention into account in interpreting the common law. They also must take the convention into account in interpreting Acts of Parliament, but must ultimately follow the terms of the Act even if inconsistent with the convention (s3 HRA).)

Britain has long been a major trading nation, exerting a strong influence on the law of shipping and maritime trade. The English law of salvage, collisions, ship arrest, and carriage of goods by sea are subject to international conventions which Britain played a leading role in drafting. Many of these conventions incorporate principles derived from English common law (Note: Such as the rule on deviation) and documentary procedures. (Note: Such as the Lloyd's Open Form)

== British jurisdictions ==
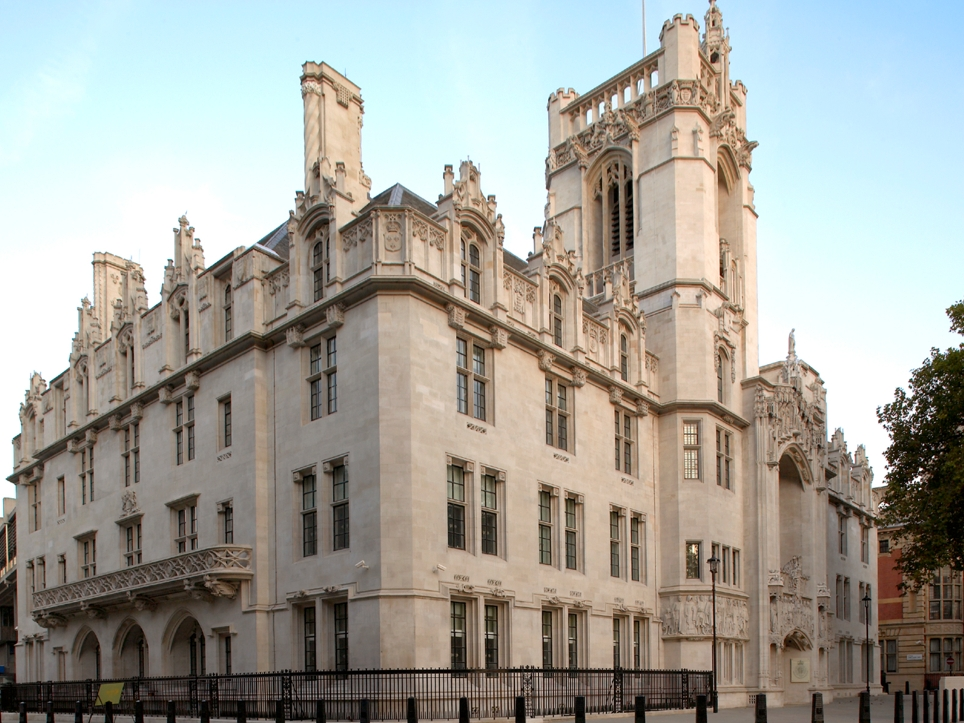
The former Middlesex Guildhall in Parliament Square is now the location of the Supreme Court of the United Kingdom.

The United Kingdom of Great Britain and Northern Ireland comprises three legal jurisdictions: England and Wales, Scotland, and Northern Ireland. Although Scotland and Northern Ireland form part of the United Kingdom and share the Parliament at Westminster as the primary legislature, they have separate legal systems. Scotland and England joined in the Kingdom of Great Britain over 300 years ago, but Scots law has remained remarkably distinct from English law.

The UK's highest civil appeal court is the Supreme Court of the United Kingdom, whose decisions, and those of its predecessor the House of Lords, are binding on all three UK jurisdictions, unless obviously limited to a principle of distinct English and Welsh, Scottish or Northern Irish law, as in Donoghue v Stevenson, a Scots case that forms the basis of the UK's law of negligence.

=== Application of English law to Wales ===
Unlike Scotland and Northern Ireland, Wales is not a separate jurisdiction within the United Kingdom. The customary laws of Wales within the Kingdom of England were abolished by King Henry VIII's Laws in Wales Acts, which brought Wales into legal conformity with England. While Wales now has a devolved parliament (the Senedd), any legislation it passes must adhere to circumscribed subjects under the Government of Wales Act 2006, to other legislation of the British Parliament, or to any Order in Council given under the authority of the 2006 Act.

Any reference to England in legislation between 1746 and 1967 is deemed to include Wales. As to later legislation, any application to Wales must be expressed under the Welsh Language Act 1967 and the jurisdiction is, since, correctly and widely referred to as England and Wales.

Devolution has granted some political autonomy to Wales via the Welsh Parliament, which gained its power to pass primary legislation under the Government of Wales Act 2006, in force since the 2007 Welsh general election. The legal system administered through civil and criminal courts is unified throughout England and Wales.

This is different from Northern Ireland, for example, which did not cease to be a distinct jurisdiction when its legislature was suspended (see Northern Ireland (Temporary Provisions) Act 1972). A major difference is use of the Welsh language, as laws concerning it apply in Wales and not in the rest of the United Kingdom. The Welsh Language Act 1993 is an Act of the Parliament of the United Kingdom, which put the Welsh language on an equal footing with the English language in Wales with regard to the public sector. Welsh may also be spoken in Welsh courts.

There have been some calls from both Welsh academics and politicians for a separate Welsh justice system.

== Classes of English law ==
- Administrative law
- Arbitration law
- Charities
- Civil procedure in England and Wales and Legal Services and Institutions
- Commercial law
- Company law
- Constitutional law
- Contract law
- Criminal law (Note: English criminal law derives its main principles from the common law. The main elements of a crime are the actus reus (doing something which is criminally prohibited) and a mens rea (having the requisite criminal state of mind, usually intention or recklessness). A prosecutor must show that a person has caused the offensive conduct, or that the culprit had some pre-existing duty to take steps to avoid a criminal consequence. The types of different crimes ranging from those well-known ones like manslaughter, murder, theft and robbery to many regulatory and statutory offenses. It is estimated that in the UK, there are 3,500 classes of a criminal offence. Certain defences may exist to crimes, which include self-defence, intention, necessity, duress, and in the case of a murder charge, diplomatic immunity and under the Homicide Act 1957, diminished responsibility, provocation and, in very rare cases, the survival of a suicide pact. It has often been suggested that England and Wales should codify its criminal law in an English Criminal Code, but there has been no overwhelming support for this in the past.)
- Criminal (law) procedure
- Employment and Agency (Note: Subject to general laws from incorporated European Regulations and Directives and mainly regulated in the same way across the United Kingdom)
- Equity
- Financial services and institutions (Note: Almost uniform throughout the UK)
- Evidence and Actionability
- Family law (private and public regarding local authorities)
- Bankruptcy and Insolvency
- Probate (and intestacy) law
- Property law (with tort, contract and criminal overlap) (includes land, landlord and tenant, occupancy, housing conditions and intellectual property law, sales, auctions and repossessions)
- Maritime law and law of the sea (mainly private and public international law)
- Taxation, tax credits and benefits law (Note: Harmonised, not uniform, across the UK)
- Tort law
- Trust law

== See also ==
- Books of authority
- Effect of European Communities Act 1972
- Law Commission (England and Wales)
- Halsbury's Laws of England
- Law of Church of England
- Military law in the UK
- Open justice
- Order in Council
- Scots law
- Welsh law
- Chief Justice Coke's rulings in
  - Case of Proclamations
  - Case of Prohibitions

== Bibliography ==
- Beale, Joseph H. (1935). A Treatise on the Conflict of Laws. ISBN 978-1-58477-425-9
- Darbyshire, Penny (2017). Darbyshire on the English Legal System, 12th edn. London: Sweet & Maxwell (formerly Eddey on the English legal system) ISBN 978-0-414-05785-2 (not the same as below)
- Dicey, A. V., J. H. C. Morris, & Lawrence Collins (1993). Dicey and Morris on the Conflict of Laws, 12th edn. London: Sweet & Maxwell ISBN 978-0-420-48280-8
- Slapper, Gary & Kelly, David (2016). The English legal system (18 ed.). London: Routledge. ISBN 978-1-138-94445-9.
- Barnett, Hilaire (2008). Constitutional & Administrative Law. London: Routledge-Cavendish. ISBN 978-0-415-45829-0.
