= Photo Production Ltd v Securicor Transport Ltd =

- Court: House of Lords
- Full case name: Photo Production Ltd v Securicor Transport Ltd
- Decided: 14 February 1980
- Citation: [1980] AC 827, [1980] UKHL 2

Case history
- Prior action: [1978] 1 WLR 856

Court membership
- Judges sitting: Lord Wilberforce, Lord Diplock, Lord Salmon, Lord Keith of Kinkel, Lord Scarman

Keywords
- Fundamental breach, construction

Photo Production Ltd v Securicor Transport Ltd [1980] UKHL 2 is an English contract law case decided by the House of Lords on construction of a contract and the doctrine of fundamental breach.

== Facts ==
Photo Productions Ltd engaged Securicor to guard their premises at night. A night-watchman, Mr Musgrove, started a fire in a brazier at Photo Production's factory to keep himself warm. The fire spread accidentally and the Photo Productions plant was totally destroyed by fire, causing £648,000 worth of damage. When Photo Productions sued, Securicor argued that an exemption clause in the contract excused liability. The clause provided: "under no circumstances shall Securicor be responsible for any injurious act or default by any employee… unless such act or default could have been foreseen and avoided by the exercise of due diligence on the part of [Securicor]." Photo Productions argued that the clause could not apply under the doctrine of fundamental breach, that the breach of the contract went to the root of the contract, it invalidated the whole agreement and extinguished the exclusion clause.

== Judgment ==
=== Court of Appeal ===
Lord Denning MR held that the doctrine of fundamental breach did apply, and that Securicor was liable. He said if the breach was fundamental then the exclusion clause would be invalid, following his decision in Harbutt's "Plasticine" Ltd v Wayne Tank and Pump Co Ltd. He said the following.

It seems to me that the two ways can be seen to meet in practice so as to produce a result in principle which may be stated thus: although the clause in its natural and ordinary meaning would seem to give exemption from or limitation of liability for a breach, nevertheless the court will not give the party that exemption or limitation if the court can say: “The parties as reasonable men cannot have intended that there should be exemption or limitation in the case of such a breach as this.” In so stating the principle, there arises in these cases “the figure of the fair and reasonable man”; and the spokesman of this fair and reasonable man, as Lord Radcliffe once said, is and “must be the court itself”: see Davis Contractors Ltd v Fareham Urban District Council [1956] AC 696, 728–729. Thus we reach, after long years, the principle which lies behind all our striving: the court will not allow a party to rely on an exemption or limitation clause in circumstances in which it would not be fair or reasonable to allow reliance on it; and, in considering whether it is fair and reasonable, the court will consider whether it was in a standard form, whether there was equality of bargaining power, the nature of the breach, and so forth.

Shaw and Waller LJJ concurred. Securicor appealed.

=== House of Lords ===
The House of Lords overturned the Court of Appeal and held that Securicor's exclusion clause was effective and exempt it from liability for damage. Lord Diplock held that the clause’s effectiveness was a question of construction of the contract, and that it did cover the damage. He noted ‘the reports are full of cases in which what would appear to be very strained constructions have been placed upon exclusion clauses’ though the need should have gone since the passage of the Unfair Contract Terms Act 1977.

Lord Wilberforce, writing for the Court, overturned Denning and found that the exclusion clause could be relied upon. Wilberforce explicitly rejected Denning's application of the doctrine of fundamental breach and opted for a "rule of construction" approach. Exemption clauses are to be interpreted the same as any other term regardless of whether a breach has occurred. The scope of the exclusion is determined by examining the construction of the contract. On the facts, Wilberforce found that the exclusion clause precluded all liability even when harm was caused intentionally. He went out of his way to disapprove the doctrine of fundamental breach of contract.

Lord Denning M.R. in this was following the earlier decision of the Court of Appeal, and in particular his own judgment in Harbutt's "Plasticine" Ltd v Wayne Tank and Pump Co Ltd [1970] 1 Q.B. 447. In that case Lord Denning M.R. distinguished two cases (a) the case where as the result of a breach of contract the innocent party has, and exercises, the right to bring the contract to an end, (b) the case where the breach automatically brings the contract to an end, without the innocent party having to make an election whether to terminate the contract or to continue it. In the first case the Master of the Rolls, purportedly applying this House's decision in Suisse Atlantique Societe d'Armament SA v NV Rotterdamsche Kolen Centrale [1967] 1 AC 361, but in effect two citations from two of their Lordships' speeches, extracted a rule of law that the "termination" of the contract brings it and with it the exclusion clause, to an end. The Suisse Atlantique case in his view

...affirms the long line of cases in this court that when one party has been guilty of a fundamental breach of the contract ... and the other side accepts it, so that the contract comes to an end... then the guilty party cannot rely on an exception or limitation clause to escape from his liability for the breach. (Harbutt's case [1970] 1 Q.B. 447, 467).

He then applied the same principle to the second case.

My Lords, whatever the intrinsic merit of this doctrine, as to which I shall have something to say later, it is clear to me that so far from following this House's decision in the Suisse Atlantique it is directly opposed to it and that the whole purpose and tenor of the Suisse Atlantique was to repudiate it. The lengthy, and perhaps I may say sometimes indigestible speeches of their Lordships, are correctly summarised in the headnote - holding No. 3 [1967] 1 A.C. 361, 362 - "That the question whether an exceptions clause was applicable where there was a fundamental breach of contract was one of the true construction of the contract." That there was any rule of law by which exceptions clauses are eliminated, or deprived of effect, regardless of their terms, was clearly not the view of Viscount Dilhorne, Lord Hodson, or of myself.

== Significance ==
The case is remembered for these principal reasons:

- first, the explicit rejection of the doctrine of fundamental breach under English law (and hence, by extension, for much of the common law world); and
- secondly, it is remembered as the high-water mark of the disputes between the Denning-led Court of Appeal and an increasingly unamused House of Lords, who strongly disapproved of Denning's attempts to remould the law in a manner that he perceived to fit the justice of the situation before him.
- thirdly, the case is a strong confirmation of the principles of the Suisse Atlantique case, which may now be considered the final statement of the common law prior to the Unfair Contract Terms Act 1977.

== See also ==
- English contract law
- DHL International (NZ) Ltd v Richmond Ltd
