= Carriage of Goods by Sea Act 1992 =

Act of the Parliament of the United Kingdom

Carriage of Goods by Sea Act 1992 (Note: Section 6(1).)
- Act of Parliament
- Parliament of the United Kingdom
- Long title: An Act to replace the Bills of Lading Act 1855 with new provision with respect to bills of lading and certain other shipping documents.
- Citation: 1992 c. 50
- Territorial extent: England and Wales; Scotland; Northern Ireland (Note: Section 6(4).); Singapore (Note: Adopted by the Parliament of Singapore through Application of English Law Act 1993 (No. 35 of 1993), now item 13, Part 2 of First Schedule to the Application of English Law Act 1993.)

Dates
- Royal assent: 16 July 1992
- Commencement: 16 September 1992 (Note: Section 6(3).)
Other legislation
Repeals/revokes	Bills of Lading Act 1855
Amended by	Communications Act 2003; Electronic Trade Documents Act 2023
Relates to	Carriage of Goods by Sea Act 1971

Status: Amended

Text of statute as originally enacted

Revised text of statute as amended

Text of the Carriage of Goods by Sea Act 1992 as in force today (including any amendments) within the United Kingdom, from legislation.gov.uk.

Bills of Lading Act 1855 (Note: The citation of this act by this short title was authorised by section 1 of, and the first schedule to, the Short Titles Act 1896. Due to the repeal of those provisions it is now authorised by section 19(2) of the Interpretation Act 1978.)
- Act of Parliament
- Parliament of the United Kingdom
- Long title: An Act to amend the Law relating to Bills of Lading.
- Citation: 18 & 19 Vict. c. 111
- Territorial extent: United Kingdom

Dates
- Royal assent: 14 August 1855
- Commencement: 14 August 1855 (Note: The Acts of Parliament (Commencement) Act 1793.)
- Repealed: 16 September 1992
Other legislation
Repealed by	Carriage of Goods by Sea Act 1992

Status: Repealed

Text of statute as originally enacted

Revised text of statute as amended

Text of the Bills of Lading Act 1855 as in force today (including any amendments) within the United Kingdom, from legislation.gov.uk.

The Carriage of Goods By Sea Act 1992 (c. 50) is an act of the Parliament of the United Kingdom regarding bills for the lading of goods onto ships. It repealed the Bills of Lading Act 1855 (18 & 19 Vict. c. 111) and made new provisions.

== Background ==
The Bills of Lading Act 1855 (18 & 19 Vict. c. 111) was commendably brief and proved useful, but as time went by certain defects became apparent. The English courts devised some ways round the problem: in Brandt v Liverpool (1924) such as the concept of implied contracts, although the courts themselves subsequently proved reluctant to adopt this concept. Nevertheless, there were difficulties relating to passing of property and passing of risk.

The Law Commission and the Scottish Law Commission addressed the issue in a report, "Rights of Suit in respect of Carriage of Goods by Sea". The report contained a draft bill which Parliament adopted in full without amendment.

=== Bills of lading ===
A bill of lading serves three main functions:

- it is a conclusive receipt, i.e. an acknowledgement that the goods have been loaded;
- it contains or evidences the terms of the contract of carriage; and
- it serves as a document of title to the goods, subject to the nemo dat quod non habet rule.

Although the term "bill of lading" is well known and well understood, it may become obsolete. Articles 1:15 and 1:16 of the Rotterdam Rules create the new term "transport document"; but (assuming the Rules come into force) it remains to be seen whether shippers, carriers and "maritime performing parties" (another new Rotterdam Rules coinage) will abandon the long-established and familiar term, "bill of lading".

== Provisions ==
The statute makes provision for bills of lading and other documents of carriage, as follows:

Section 1
The CoGSA 1992 now applies to bills of lading, sea waybills, and ship's delivery orders. A bill of lading must be negotiable, and includes a "received for shipment" bill. This section also empowered the minister to make regulatory provision (by way of a statutory instrument) in respect of telecommunications systems and other information technology, but this provision was removed by the Electronic Trade Documents Act 2023.
Section 2
A person who becomes the lawful holder of a bill of lading (or sea waybill, or delivery order) shall have transferred to and vested in him all rights of suit under the contract of carriage as if he had been a party to the contract.
Section 3
Where such a person (s.2) takes or demands delivery of the goods (or makes a cargo claim), that person becomes subject to the same liabilities under that contract as if he had been a party to that contract.
Section 4
A bill of lading which represents goods to have been shipped, and which is signed by the ship's master or his agent is conclusive evidence of receipt for shipment, quashing the rule in Grant v Norway 1851.
Sections 5 and 6
Section 5 deals with the interpretation of terms used in the statute and Section 6 provides for its short title.

=== Carriage of Goods by Sea Act 1971 ===
The Carriage of Goods by Sea Act 1971 incorporates the Hague-Visby Rules into English Law. These rules require (where the Article X invokes the Rules) that, on demand, the carrier must provide the shipper with a bill of lading that meets the requirements of Article III. Although the 1992 act cannot amend the Hague-Visby Rules, which are an International Convention, section 4 of the 1992 act upgrades the status of a bill of lading to be conclusive evidence of receipt for shipment.

== See also ==
- Seaworthiness (law)
