= Anticipatory repudiation =

Concept in the law of contracts

Anticipatory repudiation or anticipatory breach is a concept in the law of contracts which describes words or conduct by a contracting party that evinces an intention not to perform or not to be bound by provisions of the agreement that require performance in the future.

== Repudiation and retraction ==
A party is considered to have repudiated a contract when they evidence a lack of willingness or an inability to perform their contractual obligations. A repudiation of a contract by one party (the repudiating party) will entitle the other party (the aggrieved party) to elect to terminate the contract. This is based on objective intentions i.e. the repudiating party's words or conduct.; This unwillingness or inability to perform a condition must deprive the aggrieved party of substantially the whole of the benefit that they would have received if the remaining obligations were performed under the contract. When such an event occurs, the performing party to the contract is excused from having to fulfill his or her obligations. However, the repudiation can be retracted by the promising party so long as there has been no material change in the position of the performing party in the interim. A retraction of the repudiation restores the performer's obligation to perform on the contract.

Another rationale for the doctrine of repudiation is based on the breach of an implied term not rendering future performance futile: "[O]ne essential promise which is implied in every contract is that neither party will without just cause repudiate his obligations under the contract, whether the time for performance has arrived or not."

Repudiation of a contract by one party entitles the other party the right to terminate and claim for damages. However, it is possible that the repudiating party does not repudiate the entire contract but only certain obligations. In this case, the aggrieved party will only acquire the right to terminate if the repudiating party repudiates an obligation which, if breached, would grant a right to terminate.

If the promising party's repudiation makes it impossible to fulfil its promise, then retraction is not possible and no act by the promising party can restore the performing party's obligations under the contract. For example, if A promises to give B a unique sculpture in exchange for B painting A's house, but A then sells the sculpture to C before B begins the job, this act by A constitutes an anticipatory repudiation which excuses B from performing. Once the sculpture has left A's possession, there is no way that A can fulfil the promise to give the sculpture to B.

The Privy Council ruled in 1966 that a party who asserts "a genuinely held but erroneous view as to the effect of the contract" should not be treated as in repudiation, but in the case of Vaswani v Italian Motors, a car seller's conduct went beyond mere assertion of such an opinion, and in demanding more money for a sale than the agreed price, and in forcing the intending buyer into loss of his deposit, the conduct was held to be repudiatory. This was the case even though the demand for a higher price was made bona fide because the supply price for the car, a Ferrari Testarossa, had increased during the order period.

The question arises as to why any party would want to provide notice of anticipatory breach. The reason is that once the performing party is informed of the anticipatory breach, a duty is then created for the performing party to mitigate damages as a result of the breach. Another situation where anticipatory repudiation can occur is where a party has reason to believe the other party is not going to perform and requests reasonable assurances that the other party will perform (see UCC 2-609(1)). If such reasonable assurances are not given, it will constitute anticipatory repudiation, for which the performing party has various remedies, including termination. However, anticipatory repudiation only applies to a bilateral executory contract with non-performed duties on both sides. Additionally, the repudiation must be unequivocal.

== Measuring damages ==
In some or all common law jurisdictions, the measure of damages for an anticipatory breach is no different from the measure of damages for any other breach of contract.

=== Uniform Commercial Code ===
According to UCC 2-713(1), damages are to be measured at the time when the buyer learned of the breach. This is easy with a one transaction sale, e.g. a widget at the purchaser's door step on X date; but when does the purchaser learn of the breach in an anticipatory repudiation? There are three main views:

1. When the buyer learns of the repudiation
2. When the buyer learns of repudiation plus a commercially reasonable time
  1. UCC 2-610(a) gives this indication, the purchaser would be waiting at your risk if the vendor determined the market price at the time you learn of repudiation.
  2. UCC 2-723(1) would indicate this, but it would be superfluous with 2-713 so 2-713 must have something other than the plain meaning.
  3. (1) If an action based on anticipatory repudiation comes to 2-723 trial before the time for performance with respect to some or all of the goods, any damages based on market price (Section UCC 2-708 or Section UCC 2-713) shall be determined according to the price of such goods prevailing at the time when the aggrieved party learned of the repudiation.
  4. This is the majority view: when repudiation is accepted or within a commercial reasonable time
3. Time of performance, when the trail that occurs after the time of performance
  1. This is different from the plain reading for UCC 2-713.

== See also ==
- Breach of contract
