= Debt =

Obligation to pay borrowed money

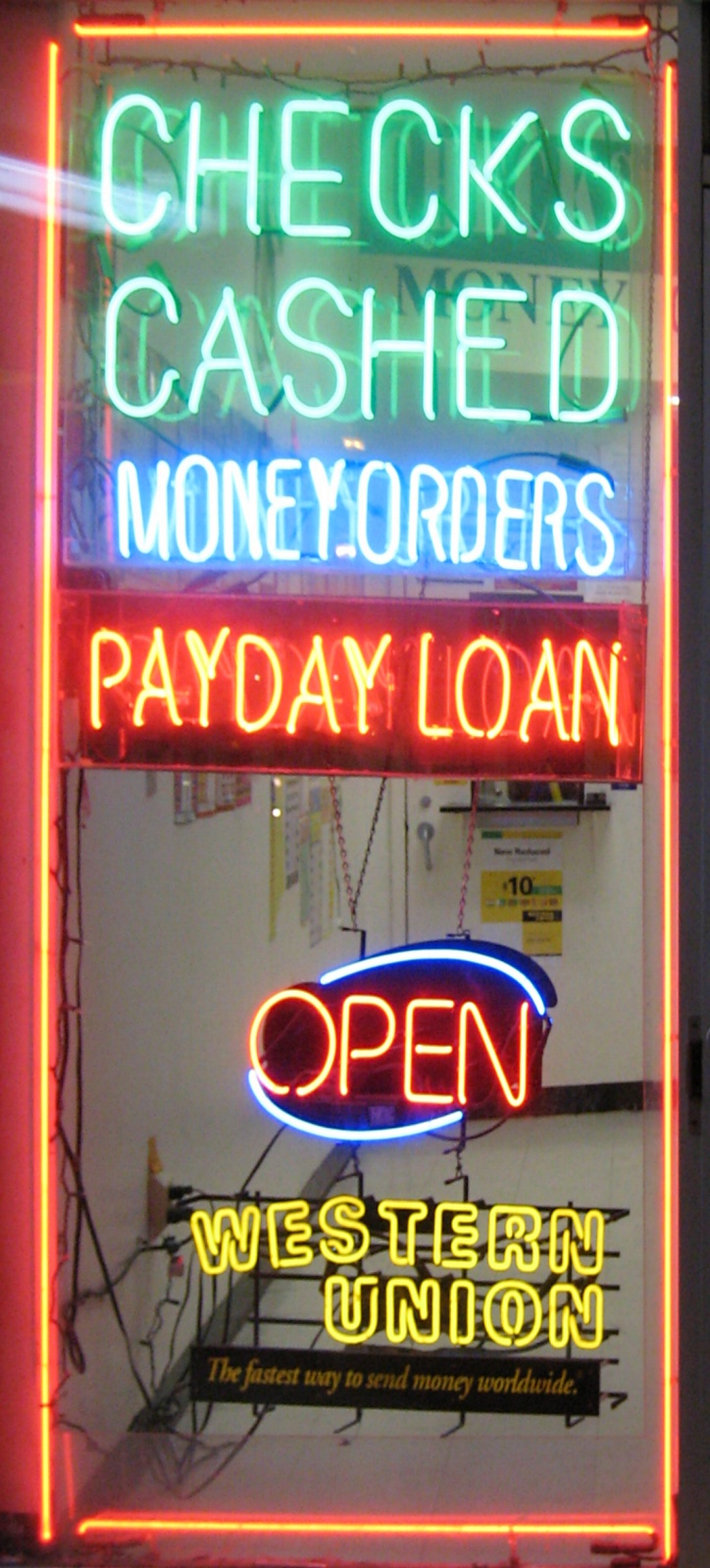
Payday loan businesses lend money to customers, who then owe a debt to the payday loan company.

Debt is an obligation that requires one party, the debtor, to pay money borrowed or otherwise withheld from another party, the creditor. Debt may be owed by a sovereign state or country, local government, company, or an individual. Commercial debt is generally subject to contractual terms regarding the amount and timing of repayments of principal and interest. Loans, bonds, notes, and mortgages are all types of debt.

The term can also be used metaphorically to cover moral obligations and other interactions not based on a monetary value. For example, in Western cultures, a person who has been helped by a second person is sometimes said to owe a "debt of gratitude" to the second person.

== Etymology ==
The English term "debt" was first used in the late 13th century and comes by way of Old French from the Latin verb debere, "to owe; to have from someone else." The related term "debtor" was first used in English also in the early 13th century.

== Terms ==
=== Principal ===
Principal is the amount of money originally invested or loaned, on which basis interest and returns are calculated.

=== Repayment ===
There are three main ways repayment may be structured: the entire principal balance may be due at the maturity of the loan; the entire principal balance may be amortized over the term of the loan; or the loan may be partially amortized during its term, with the remaining principal due as a "balloon payment" at maturity. Amortization structures are common in mortgages and credit cards.

=== Default provisions ===
Debtors of every type default on their debt from time to time, with various consequences depending on the terms of the debt and the law governing default in the relevant jurisdiction. If the debt was secured by specific collateral, such as a car or house, the creditor may seek to repossess the collateral. In more serious circumstances, individuals and companies may go into bankruptcy.

== Types of borrowers ==
=== Individuals ===
Common types of debt owed by individuals and households include mortgage loans, car loans, credit card debt, and income taxes. For individuals, debt is a means of using anticipated income and future purchasing power in the present before it has actually been earned. Commonly, people in industrialized nations use consumer debt to purchase houses, cars and other things too expensive to buy with cash on hand.

People are likely to spend more and get into debt when they use credit cards as against cash to buy products and services. This is primarily because of the transparency effect and consumer's "pain of paying." The transparency effect refers to the idea that the further you are from cash (as with a credit card or other forms of payment), the less transparent it is and the less aware you are of how much you have spent. The less transparent or further away from cash the form of payment employed is, the less an individual feels the "pain of paying" and thus is likely to spend more. Furthermore, the differing physical appearance/form that credit cards have from cash may cause them to be viewed as "monopoly" money vs. real money, luring individuals to spend more money than they would if they only had cash available.

Besides these more formal debts, private individuals also lend informally to other people, mostly relatives or friends. One reason for such informal debts is that many people, in particular those who are poor, have no access to affordable credit. Such debts can cause problems when they are not paid back according to expectations of the lending household. In 2011, 8 percent of people in the European Union reported their households has been in arrears, that is, unable to pay as scheduled "payments related to informal loans from friends or relatives not living in your household".

=== Businesses ===
A company may use various kinds of debt to finance its operations as a part of its overall corporate finance strategy.

A term loan is the simplest form of corporate debt. It consists of an agreement to lend a fixed amount of money, called the principal sum or principal, for a fixed period of time, with this amount to be repaid by a certain date. In commercial loans interest, calculated as a percentage of the principal sum per year, will also have to be paid by that date, or may be paid periodically in the interval, such as annually or monthly. Such loans are also colloquially called "bullet loans", particularly if there is only a single payment at the end – the "bullet" – without a "stream" of interest payments during the life of the loan.

A revenue-based financing loan comes with a fixed repayment target that is reached over a period of several years. This type of loan generally comes with a repayment amount of 1.5 to 2.5 times the principle loan. Repayment periods are flexible; businesses can pay back the agreed-upon amount sooner, if possible, or later. In addition, business owners do not sell equity or relinquish control when using revenue-based financing. Lenders that provide revenue-based financing work more closely with businesses than bank lenders, but take a more hands-off approach than private equity investors.

A syndicated loan is a loan that is granted to companies that wish to borrow more money than any single lender is prepared to risk in a single loan. A syndicated loan is provided by a group of lenders and is structured, arranged, and administered by one or several commercial banks or investment banks known as arrangers. Loan syndication is a risk management tool that allows the lead banks underwriting the debt to reduce their risk and free up lending capacity.

A company may also issue bonds, which are debt securities. Bonds have a fixed lifetime, usually a number of years; with long-term bonds, lasting over 30 years, being less common. At the end of the bond's life the money should be repaid in full. Interest may be added to the end payment, or can be paid in regular installments (known as coupons) during the life of the bond.

A letter of credit or LC can also be the source of payment for a transaction, meaning that redeeming the letter of credit will pay an exporter. Letters of credit are used primarily in international trade transactions of significant value, for deals between a supplier in one country and a customer in another. They are also used in the land development process to ensure that approved public facilities (streets, sidewalks, stormwater ponds, etc.) will be built. The parties to a letter of credit are usually a beneficiary who is to receive the money, the issuing bank of whom the applicant is a client, and the advising bank of whom the beneficiary is a client. Almost all letters of credit are irrevocable, i.e., cannot be amended or canceled without prior agreement of the beneficiary, the issuing bank and the confirming bank, if any. In executing a transaction, letters of credit incorporate functions common to giros and traveler's cheque. Typically, the documents a beneficiary has to present in order to receive payment include a commercial invoice, bill of lading, and a document proving the shipment was insured against loss or damage in transit. However, the list and form of documents is open to imagination and negotiation and might contain requirements to present documents issued by a neutral third party evidencing the quality of the goods shipped, or their place of origin.

Debt consolidation is a process whereby a new, large loan application is submitted in order to compensate for numerous outstanding loans. Some amongst those who are heavily indebted often resort to debt consolidation as a means to resolve their financial difficulties. Upon obtaining the borrowed loan, those within the receiving end are then generally enabled to have a greater cash flow, resulting from lowering monthly payments, if not reducing interest rates. However, this varies from every claimant, in that their own eligibility for such is entirely dependent on their own overall circumstances; Should they meet specific requirements, being able to afford such, their requests are usually accepted; Should they fail the criteria, they're almost always swiftly rejected, regardless of their financial ability. Given the often monetary hardship of contenders, those providing these loans often charge at larger rates of interest than others; This is often critiqued by its opponents, who claim that it is an unfair practice aimed at targeting those who are desperate and often holds arbitrary figures, although those in its defence claim it is a security measure aimed at ensuring its repayment obligations and must take precautions before offering large sums. Both arguments have resulted in greater debate amongst legislators in different nations, amidst demands for further regulation and more decreases in lending restrictions. Debt consolidation has also been an area of interest for loan sharks, leaving those heavily indebted vulnerable to extortionate rates. The idea behind debt consolidation is occasionally a matter of debate in the financial and institutional sectors, often ranging between analysts towards professors, generally concerning ethics involved in different areas.

Companies also use debt in many ways for capital expenditures and other business investments produced in their assets, "leveraging" the return on their equity. This leverage, the proportion of debt to equity, is considered paramount in determining the riskiness of an investment, under the notion that it becomes more risking under more debt.

=== Governments ===
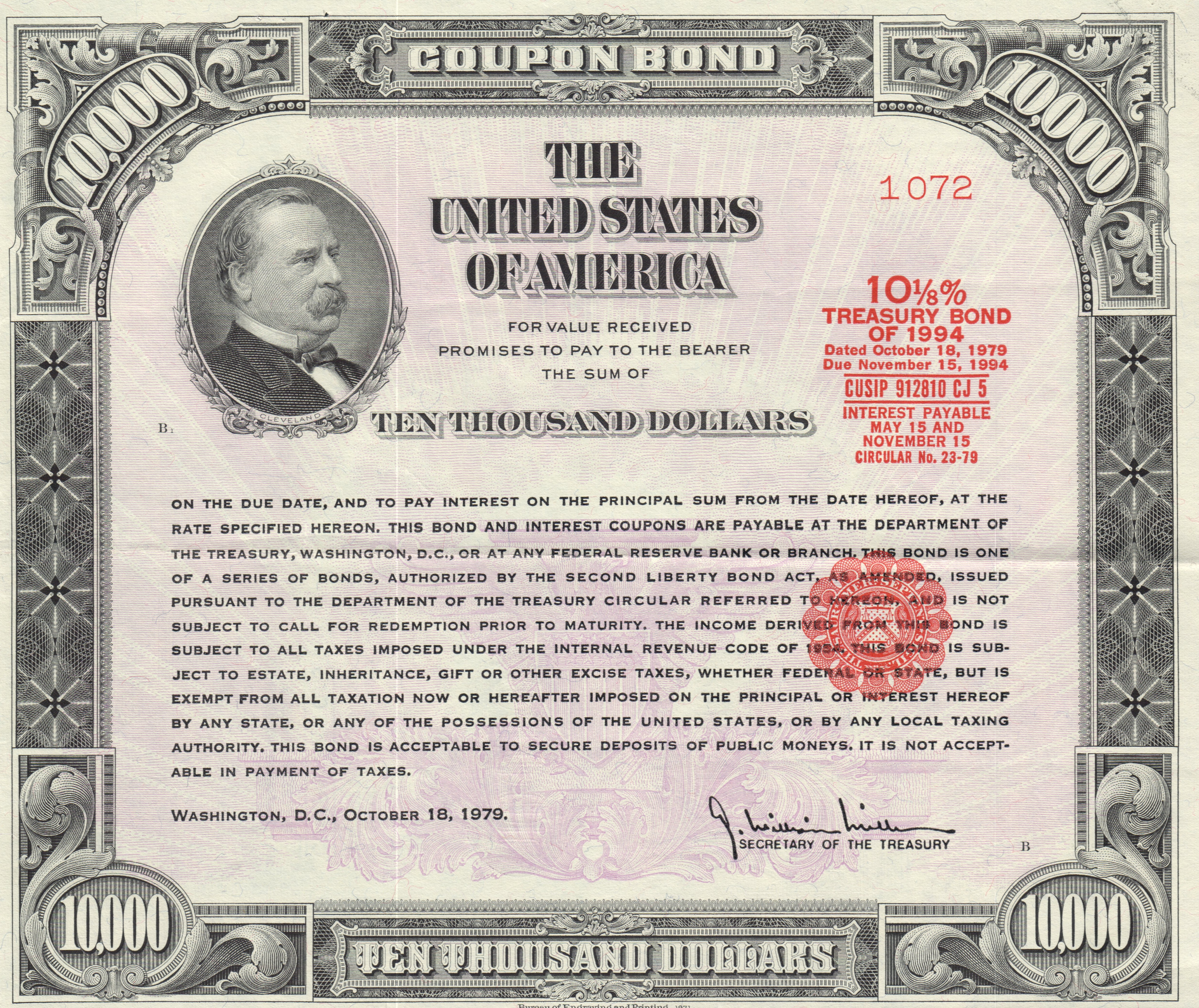
1979 U.S. Government $10,000 treasury bond

Governments issue debt to pay for ongoing expenses as well as major capital projects. Government debt may be issued by sovereign states as well as by local governments, sometimes known as municipalities.

Debt issued by the government of the United States, called Treasuries, serves as a reference point for all other debt. There are deep, transparent, liquid, and open capital markets for Treasuries. Furthermore, Treasuries are issued in a wide variety of maturities, from one day to thirty years, which facilitates comparing the interest rates on other debt to a security of comparable maturity. In finance, the theoretical "risk-free interest rate" is often approximated by practitioners by using the current yield of a Treasury of the same duration.

The overall level of indebtedness by a government is typically shown as a ratio of debt-to-GDP. This ratio helps to assess the speed of changes in government indebtedness and the size of the debt due.

The United Nations Sustainable Development Goal 17, an integral part of the 2030 Agenda has a target to address the external debt of highly indebted poor countries to reduce debt distress.

=== Municipalities ===
Municipal bonds (or muni bonds) are typical debt obligations, for which the conditions are defined unilaterally by the issuing municipality (local government), but it is a slower process to accumulate the necessary amount. Usually, debt or bond financing will not be used to finance current operating expenditures, the purposes of these amounts are local developments, capital investments, constructions, own contribution to other credits or grants.

== Assessments of creditworthiness ==
=== Income metrics ===
The debt service coverage ratio is the ratio of income available to the amount of debt service due (including both interest and principal amortization, if any). The higher the debt service coverage ratio, the more income is available to pay debt service, and the easier and lower-cost it will be for a borrower to obtain financing.

Different debt markets have somewhat different conventions in terminology and calculations for income-related metrics. For example, in mortgage lending in the United States, a debt-to-income ratio typically includes the cost of mortgage payments as well as insurance and property tax, divided by a consumer's monthly income. A "front-end ratio" of 28% or below, together with a "back-end ratio" (including required payments on non-housing debt as well) of 36% or below is also required to be eligible for a conforming loan.

=== Value metrics ===
The loan-to-value ratio is the ratio of the total amount of the loan to the total value of the collateral securing the loan.

For example, in mortgage lending in the United States, the loan-to-value concept is most commonly expressed as a "down payment." A 20% down payment is equivalent to an 80% loan to value. With home purchases, value may be assessed using the agreed-upon purchase price, and/or an appraisal.

=== Collateral and recourse ===
A debt obligation is considered secured if creditors have recourse to specific collateral. Collateral may include claims on tax receipts (in the case of a government), specific assets (in the case of a company) or a home (in the case of a consumer). Unsecured debt comprises financial obligations for which creditors do not have recourse to the assets of the borrower to satisfy their claims.

=== Role of rating agencies ===
Credit bureaus collect information about the borrowing and repayment history of consumers. Lenders, such as banks and credit card companies, use credit scores to evaluate the potential risk posed by lending money to consumers. In the United States, the primary credit bureaus are Equifax, Experian, and TransUnion.

Debts owed by governments and private corporations may be rated by rating agencies, such as Moody's, Standard & Poor's, Fitch Ratings, and A. M. Best. The government or company itself will also be given its own separate rating. These agencies assess the ability of the debtor to honor his obligations and accordingly give him or her a credit rating. Moody's uses the letters Aaa Aa A Baa Ba B Caa Ca C, where ratings Aa-Caa are qualified by numbers 1–3. S&P and other rating agencies have slightly different systems using capital letters and +/- qualifiers. Thus a government or corporation with a high rating would have Aaa rating.

A change in ratings can strongly affect a company, since its cost of refinancing depends on its creditworthiness. Bonds below Baa/BBB (Moody's/S&P) are considered junk or high-risk bonds. Their high risk of default (approximately 1.6 percent for Ba) is compensated by higher interest payments. Bad Debt is a loan that can not (partially or fully) be repaid by the debtor. The debtor is said to default on their debt. These types of debt are frequently repackaged and sold below face value. Buying junk bonds is seen as a risky but potentially profitable investment.

== Debt markets ==
=== Loans versus bonds ===
Bonds are debt securities, tradeable on a bond market. A country's regulatory structure determines what qualifies as a security. For example, in North America, each security is uniquely identified by a CUSIP for trading and settlement purposes. In contrast, loans are not securities and do not have CUSIPs (or the equivalent). Loans may be sold or acquired in certain circumstances, as when a bank syndicates a loan.

Loans can be turned into securities through the securitization process. In a securitization, a company sells a pool of assets to a securitization trust, and the securitization trust finances its purchase of the assets by selling securities to the market. For example, a trust may own a pool of home mortgages, and be financed by residential mortgage-backed securities. In this case, the asset-backed trust is a debt issuer of residential mortgage-backed securities.

=== Role of central banks ===
Central banks, such as the U.S. Federal Reserve System, play a key role in the debt markets. Debt is normally denominated in a particular currency, and so changes in the valuation of that currency can change the effective size of the debt. This can happen due to inflation or deflation, so it can happen even though the borrower and the lender are using the same currency.

== Effects on mental health ==
At the household level, debts can also have detrimental effects — particularly when households make spending decisions assuming income will increase, or remain stable, in years to come. When households take on credit based on this assumption, life events can easily change indebtedness into over-indebtedness. Such life events include unexpected unemployment, relationship break-up, leaving the parental home, business failure, illness, or home repairs. Over-indebtedness has severe social consequences, such as financial hardship, poor physical and mental health, family stress, stigma, difficulty obtaining employment, exclusion from basic financial services (European Commission, 2009), work accidents and industrial disease, a strain on social relations (Carpentier and Van den Bosch, 2008), absenteeism at work and lack of organisational commitment (Kim et al., 2003), feeling of insecurity, and relational tensions.

A 2026 study conducted by the Centre for Homelessness Impact and the Personal Finance Research Centre at the University of Bristol suggests that problem debt is a systemic driver of homelessness. Debt can damage people's mental and physical health, reducing their ability to engage with services and landlords.

== History ==
According to historian Paul Johnson, the lending of "food money" was commonplace in Middle Eastern civilizations as early as 5000 BC.

Religions like Judaism and Christianity for example, demand that debt be forgiven on a regular basis, in order to prevent systemic inequities between groups in society, or anyone becoming a specialist in holding debt and coercing repayment. An example is the Biblical Jubilee year, described in the Book of Leviticus. Similarly, in Deuteronomy chapter 15 and verse 1 states that debts be forgiven after seven years. This is because biblically debt is seen as the responsibility of both the creditor and the debtor. Traditional Christian teaching holds that a lifestyle of debt should not be normative; the Emmanuel Association, a Methodist denomination in the conservative holiness movement, for example, teaches: "We are to refrain from entering into debt when we have no reasonable plan to pay. We are to be careful to meet all financial engagements promptly when due, if at all possible, remembering that we are to 'Provide things honest in the sight of all men' and to 'owe no man any thing, but to love one another' (Romans 12:17; 13:8)."

== See also ==
- Debt theory of money
- Debt deflation
- Negative equity
- World debt
