= Currency booklet =

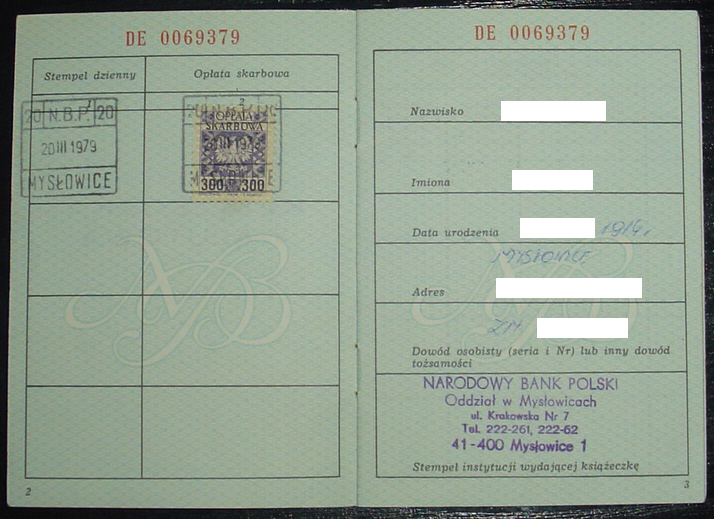
Sample record in a currency booklet

Currency booklet (Polish: Książeczka walutowa) was a document for the citizens of Polish People's Republic during 1970-1980s that kept records of the purchases of the currency of other Eastern Bloc states to use it abroad. Unused foreign currency could be returned to the currency booklet. There was a limit of 30,000 zlotys for the amount of purchase per two years. The currency could be purchased as it is, as well as in the form of traveler's checks.
