= Real-time economy =

Real-time economy (not to be confused with real economy) is an environment where all the transactions between business entities are in digital format, increasingly automatically generated, and completed in real-time (as they occur) without store and forward processing, both from business and IT-processing perspectives. For enterprises, public sector, and citizens this means, for example, that (purchase) orders, order confirmations, invoices, and payments flow from system to system without delays. This makes it possible to move towards electronic archiving, electronic book-keeping, and automated accounting.

Real-time economy can be described as an economic system from which the time-consuming intermediate steps between sales and reporting are eliminated. All the elements of business transaction, like sales, invoicing, accounting, tax payment and business reporting, will take place automatically, in a digital environment and in real time.

For example, the real-time enterprise can be considered as a giant spreadsheet of sorts, in which new information, such as an order, is automatically processed and percolates through a firm's computer systems and those of its suppliers. The core objective of the real-time economy is the reduction of latency between and within processes. Latency reduction will reduce capital occupancy costs by occupying assets (physical and labor) for less time. It aims at promoting new technologies that enable a more real-time economy, processes, and services.

== Development of the concept ==
The term ‘real-time economy’ was first used already in 2002 Ludwig Siegele's article “The Real-Time Economy: How about Now?”. This article illustrated how real-time business information was used for management purposes in the General Electric company. The initial concept of Real-Time Economy was founded in collaboration with Tieto and Aalto University School of Business in 2006 and it is partly funded by the Finnish Funding Agency for Technology and Innovation. A specialized Real-Time Economy Competence Center has been created for that matter in Aalto University. Several events and conferences have been organized by the competence center as from 2015.

Estonia has a strong image of e-country and has also started to develop the concept since 2015 by the Estonian Association of ICT Enterprises within the context of Internet of Business projects in cooperation with Finnish counterparts. Ever since, Estonia has assumed a leading role together with Finland in developing and implementing real-time economy principles in Nordic-Baltic cooperation. Three thematic round-table events have been organized in 2018-2019 both in Tallinn and Helsinki. A relevant roadmap has been created for 2020-2027 under the guidance of the Estonian Ministry of Economic Affairs and Communications. This subject has also been brought to the attention of the UNCTAD being one of the topics in 2020 eCommerce Week.

== Research ==
Numerous theses have been written on that subject matter in Aalto University since 2008, ranging from specifically real-time economy subject to adjacent subjects contributing to the ecosystem of real-time economy.

In 2019 Tallinn University of Technology conducted an academic research on “Real-Time Economy: Definitions and Implementation Opportunities” covering literature, stakeholders’ views, overview of real-time economy initiatives in Europe as well as ideas for moving forward. It established that real-time economy is a digital ecosystem where transactions between diverse economic actors take place in or near real time. This means replacing paper-based business transactions and administrative procedures by automatic exchange of digital, structured and machine-readable data in standardized formats.

A separate study on economic impact of real-time economy conducted by Tieto Estonia AS in 2020 established that real-time economy is not a specific type of economy, but a term that refers to an information-based infrastructure where data on economic transactions are transferred between the parties in real time. This study focused on economic and environmental impact of six real-time economy specific solutions: e-invoicing, e-receipt, e-CMR, implementing of XBRL GL in reporting, agricultural machinery data processing and real-time economic forecasting. It found that switching to real-time economy solutions in selected processes will save more than 210 million euros per year, over 14 million working hours per year and reduce greenhouse gas emissions in Estonia by over 27,000 tonnes per year. This translates roughly to 150 euros per person, 10 working hours per person and about 20 kg of CO_{2} per person in a year in any given country utilising real-time economy solutions.

== Other applications and spill-over effects ==
Considering real-time economy concept's ecosystemic nature and harnessing of real-time computing principle, the list of possible applications is virtually limitless. As mentioned above, the main goal of the real-time economy is the reduction of latency between and within processes while promoting new technologies that enable more real-time solutions and services. As a result, time and money can be saved by enterprises, citizens and governments if real-time economy principles are applied in everyday transaction of affairs.

=== Facilitator of circular economy ===
Real-time economy concept has all the necessary components to facilitate full realization of circular economy. Similarly to track-and-trace technology known from logistics (as well as drug distribution and tobacco products tracking) a like solution could be created for any product released on the market. It would be theoretically possible to track and trace any product's life cycle from production facility up to recycling. Depending on the attributed information set for specific product an effective practice of circular economy could be realized.

=== Institution for green growth ===
Considering functional principles of real-time economy, it can be used as an institution in broad sense for enabling realization of green growth. Different building blocks of the real-time economy ecosystem can be used as an aggregate tool to facilitate the use and consumption of natural resources in a sustainable manner. In this regard, production data, logistics and distribution information could be captured from value chains and supply chains and attributed to specific products and services. Thus creating a new set of comparative advantage metrics for global trade and international competitiveness.
