= Circular note =

In banking, a circular note is a document request by a bank to its foreign correspondents to pay a specified sum of money to a named person. The person in whose favour a circular note is issued is furnished with a letter (containing the signature of an official of the bank and the person named) called a letter of indication, which is usually referred to in the circular note, and must be produced on presentation of the note. Circular notes are generally issued against a payment of cash to the amount of the notes, but the notes need not necessarily be cashed, but may be returned to the banker in exchange for the amount for which they were originally issued.

It is the duty of the payer to see that payment is made to the proper person and that the signature is valid; he cannot recover the amount of a forged note from the banker who issued the note.

== See also ==
- Cheque
- Circular letter of credit
- Hawala
- Letter of credit
- Traveler's cheque
