= Motorette Corporation =

American automaker (1945-1948)

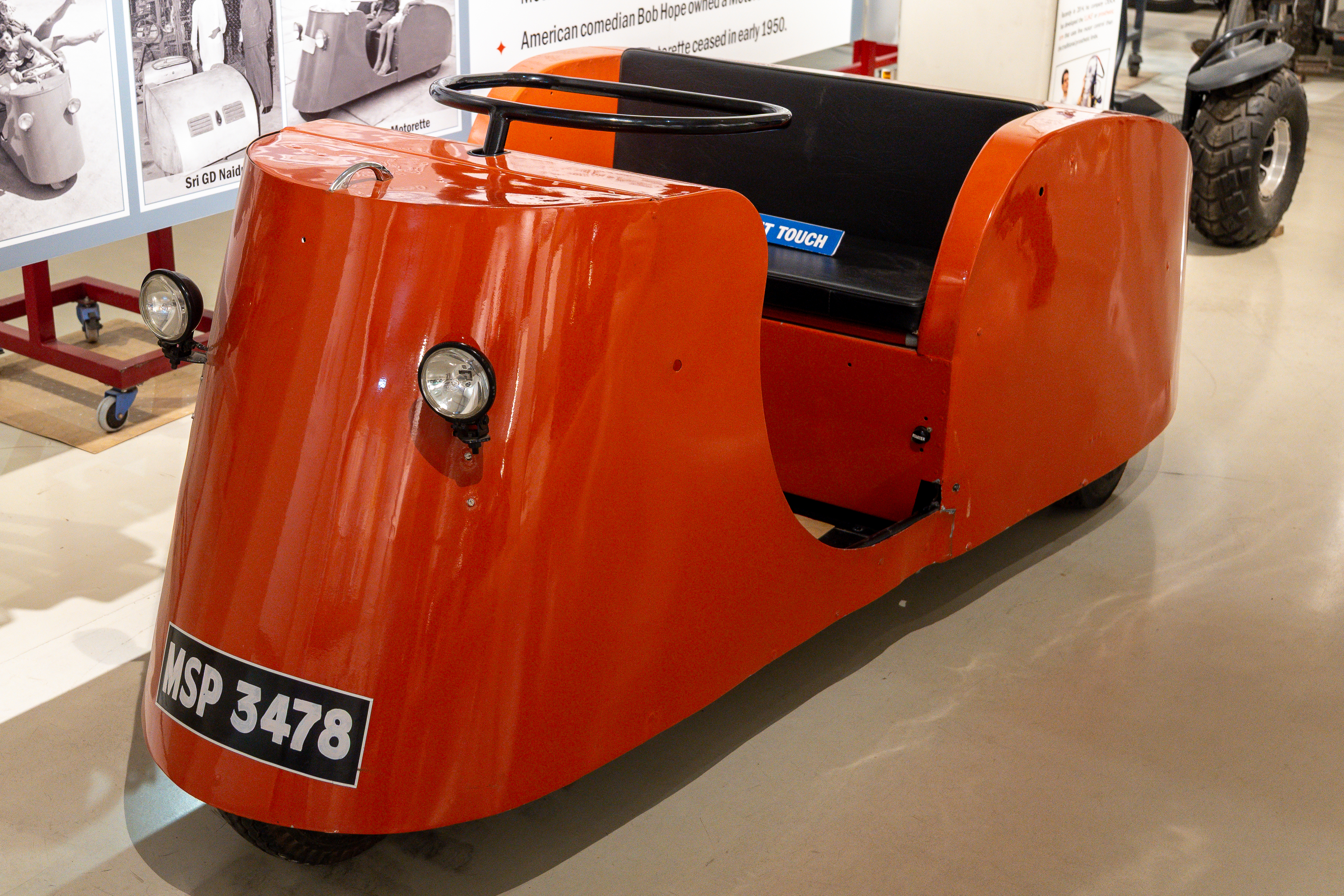
Motorette in the Gedee Car Museum, Coimbatore, TN, India

The Motorette Corporation was an automaker based in Buffalo, New York, from 1945 to 1948. It was noted for manufacturing the Motorette, a three-wheeled miniature vehicle which was marketed as a compact auxiliary alternative to standard cars in more heavily congested areas in the years following World War II, with about 6,000 being produced and sold across the United States, Asia, and Latin America.

== History ==
Incorporated in September 1945, the Motorette Corporation's history traces back to the construction of a predecessor vehicle of what ultimately became the Motorette, which was originally designed by engineer John C. Parkin of the Curtiss-Wright Corporation as a means of quickly traversing that company's one-mile long aircraft plant in Buffalo, New York. However, following the conclusion of World War II, Parkin along with fellow former Curtiss-Wright employees Stephen A. Bucholtz and Kenneth Breckenridge founded the Motorette Corporation to manufacture the vehicle for the commercial market. By March 1946, the Motorette Corporation had four distributors and 28 dealers across the United States. The company produced approximately 6,000 vehicles which were sold throughout the US, particularly in south Florida, and also fulfilled international orders including a 1948 contract that saw 210 Motorettes delivered to an Indian maharajah six months after India's independence from Great Britain, paid for with a $130,000 letter of credit which was the largest such payment issued from the newly independent country at the time. After consecutive years of rapid expansion, the Motorette Corporation ceased production in July 1948 due to changing economic conditions, with its assets being sold at auction for $55,000 to the Delavan Welding Corporation of Buffalo, which discontinued automobile production.

== Vehicles ==
The Motorette was a three-wheeled roadster with no doors or top, and an optional windshield. Manufactured for simplicity of use, it sported a two-speed, automatic clutch with push-button electric self-starter, features quite uncommon for the era. It was steered by a handlebar-style wheel, and its mechanical drive brake doubled as a parking brake, limiting the number of pedals to only two. The Motorette further featured a horn as well as distinctive headlights, supported by its 6 volt battery. Its one-wheel (rear left) chain drive was powered by a one-cylinder, four-cycle, 4.1 horsepower, air-cooled Wisconsin engine, which featured no reverse gear but could turn within its own radius or be pushed backward by foot given its relatively light 375 lbs weight. The Motorette measured 90 inches long by 44 inches wide and featured a chrome-steel chassis with aluminum body and 4"x8" balloon-type tires. It could achieve a top speed of 39 mph and had a one-gallon sized fuel tank with efficiency of approximately 80 mpg. While the engine was mounted in the rear, there was an additional 6 cubic feet of cargo space under the rear hood. It initially sold in the $400–500 range and was available in a choice of four different colors (red, blue, green, and yellow). Comedian Bob Hope was an early owner and sponsor of the Motorette.

The Truckette was envisioned as a specialized model of the Motorette tailored for commercial and delivery purposes and began production in 1947. While possessing the same chassis as the Motorette, its more powerful 6 horsepower engine could achieve speeds of 45 mph and it was capable of accommodating a cargo load of up to 500 lbs. Its dimensions were 90" x 48", only four inches wider than the standard Motorette and identical in length, which was still notably more compact than a typical sedan of the time.
