= Delivery order =

Document permitting the delivery of goods

A delivery order (abbreviated D/O) is a document from a consignee, or an owner or his agent of a freight carrier which orders the release of the transportation of cargo to another party. Usually the written order permits the direct delivery of goods to a warehouseman, carrier or other person who in the course of their ordinary business issue warehouse receipts or bills of lading.

According to the Uniform Commercial Code (UCC) a delivery order refers to an "order given by an owner of goods to a person in possession of them (the carrier or warehouseman) directing that person to deliver the goods to a person named in the order."

A delivery order which is used for the import of cargo should not be confused with delivery instructions. Delivery Instructions provides "specific information to the inland carrier concerning the arrangement made by the forwarder to deliver the merchandise to the particular pier or steamship line."

"A delivery order was not regarded as a document of title at common law with the result that the transfer of the delivery order did not effect transfer of constructive possession of the goods. Attornment on the part of the bailee was required (i.e., an acknowledgement that the bailee held the goods on behalf of the transferee). The Uniform Documents of Title Act permits the use of negotiable delivery orders (if the order directs delivery to a named person or order). However, it is still necessary to single out delivery orders for special treatment. Until the delivery order is accepted by the bailee, there is no basis for imposing obligations on the bailee. See discussion under sections 18 and 19 . See also the definition of "issuer"."

== See also ==
- Issuer
- Bailee
- Freight forwarder
- Title (property)
- Shipping list
- Document automation
