= Warehouse receipt =

A warehouse receipt is a document that provides proof of ownership of commodities (e.g., bars of copper) that are stored in a warehouse, vault, or depository for safekeeping.

Warehouse receipts may be negotiable or non-negotiable. Negotiable warehouse receipts allow transfer of ownership of that commodity without having to deliver the physical commodity. See Delivery order.

Most warehouse receipts are issued in negotiable form, making them eligible as collateral for loans. Non-negotiable receipts must be endorsed upon transfer.

In the United States, warehouse receipts are generally regulated by Article 7 of the Uniform Commercial Code as adopted by the various jurisdictions.

Warehouse receipts also guarantee existence and availability of a commodity of a particular quantity, type, and quality in a named storage facility. It may also show transfer of ownership for immediate delivery or for delivery at a future date. Rather than delivering the actual commodity, negotiable warehouse receipts are used to settle expiring futures contracts.

Warehouse receipts may also indicate ownership of inventory goods and/or unfinished goods stored in a warehouse by a manufacturer or distributor.

== See also ==
- Bailment
- Delivery order
- Title (property)
- Document automation
