= Advising bank =

An advising bank (also known as a notifying bank) advises a beneficiary (exporter) that a letter of credit (L/C) opened by an issuing bank for an applicant (importer) is available. An advising bank's responsibility is to authenticate the letter of credit issued by the issuer to avoid fraud. The advising bank is not necessarily responsible for the payment of the credit which it advises the beneficiary of. The advising bank is usually located in the beneficiary's country. It can be (1) a branch office of the issuing bank or a correspondent bank, or (2) a bank appointed by the beneficiary. An important point is the beneficiary has to be comfortable with the advising bank.

In case (1), the issuing bank most often sends the L/C through its branch office or correspondent bank to avoid fraud. The branch office or the correspondent bank maintains specimen signature(s) on file where it may counter-check the signature(s) on the L/C, and it has a coding system (a secret test key) to distinguish a genuine L/C from a fraudulent one (authentication).

In case (2), the beneficiary can request the applicant to specify his/her bank (the beneficiary's bank) as the advising bank in an L/C application. In many countries, this is beneficial to the beneficiary, who may avail themselves of the reduced bank charges and fees because of special relationships with the bank. Under normal circumstances, advising charges are standard and minimal. In addition, it is more convenient to deal with the beneficiary's own bank over a bank with which the beneficiary does not maintain an account.
