= Circular letter of credit =

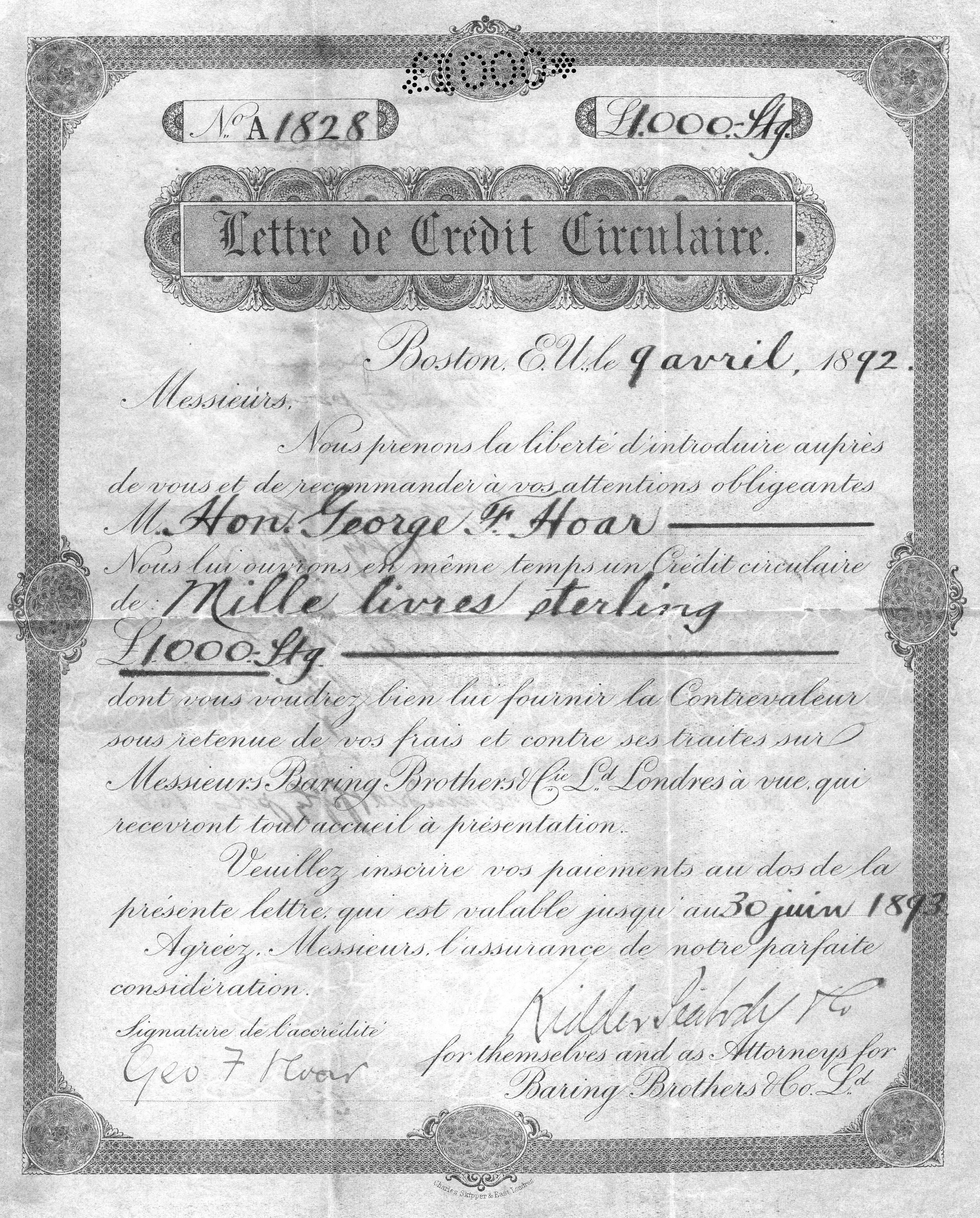
A circular letter of credit issued by Baring Brothers to US Senator George Hoar for £1000, a very large sum of money in 1892.

A circular letter of credit was a letter of credit issued by a bank or related financial institution to a private person, usually an individual of means, which enabled that person to draw funds from correspondent banks while traveling. This was considered safer than carrying large sums of cash. Early examples of the use of personal letters of credit can be found as far back as the Renaissance and they became more standardized by the latter half of the 18th century. Circular letters of credit were widely used until the 1970s. However, with the advent of modern electronic banking, ATMs, debit cards, and credit cards, they have largely fallen into disuse.

Such letters were often issued on special paper with formal lettering and designs to discourage counterfeiting. The circular letter of credit generally consisted of two or three separate items. The first was the actual letter addressed to correspondent banks stating the amount of funds that can be drawn. The reverse of the letter usually contained space to record the drawing of funds against the letter and the current balance. The second item was a list of correspondent banks in the area where the letter holder expected to be traveling. The third was a signature card which was expected to be presented for comparison when drawing funds. Also referred to as a "letter of indication," it may have contained additional information such as a description of the letter bearer intended to add a level of security. Travelers were advised to keep the letter and signature card separate from one another as a precaution against theft.

Banks typically charged around 1% of the value of the letter for its issuance. Circular letters of credit were in many ways similar to circular notes which were in turn a precursor to later traveler's cheques. Because of the expense involved, most financial institutions had minimum values for which they would issue such letters. In the 19th century, in the United States, this was typically $500.

== See also ==
- Banking
- Letter of credit
- Travel
