= Bank payment obligation =

Bank payment obligation (BPO) is a class of settlement solution in international supply chain finance.

The solution is championed by SWIFT and the International Chamber of Commerce (ICC) Banking Commission as a means to move away from letter of credit schemes toward "support[ing] the development of a globally accepted standardised environment and establishment of the BPO as a neutral industry-wide practice".

== History ==
The International Chamber of Commerce (Banking Commission) Bank Payments Obligation Working Group (ICC-BPO) held its first meeting in Zürich, Switzerland in March 2011 with the participation of nine banks. The ICC Banking Commission and SWIFT developed the Uniform Rules for Bank Payment Obligations (URBPO), which were launched on 24 June 2013.

== Operation ==
A bank payment obligation is an irrevocable undertaking given by one bank to another bank that payment will be made on a specified date after a successful electronic data match. In practice, the buyer's and seller's banks compare trade data through a transaction matching application, and a match establishes the baseline used to trigger the payment obligation.

The BPO was designed as a paperless trade finance instrument positioned between traditional documentary credits and open-account trade. ICC materials describe it as a means of supporting risk mitigation and financing through standardized electronic data matching rather than document examination.

== See also ==
- Supply chain management
