= Short shipment =

A short shipment describes the absence, non-delivery, or incomplete fulfillment of cargo on a shipping list. Conversely, an over shipment describes a surplus of cargo. Short shipment and over shipment can occur for a number of reasons and can refer to an actual incorrect shipment or to a report by the recipient that disputes shipping records.

== Causes ==
Over shipment and short shipment are caused when the incorrect quantity is shipped or the incorrect quantity of shipments is listed. Short shipment can also be reported by the recipient if a received quantity does not match the stated shipment quantity, usually due to loss or theft. Over shipment, however, is unlikely to occur due to changes in transit, unless spurious items enter the cargo or the shipping list is damaged/altered in transit.

== Problems ==
Short shipments and over shipments often cause accounting problems due to mismatching paperwork, requiring manual correction.

False short shipment reports can be used to commit fraud by reporting received items as missing. Attempts to prevent detection of such practice generally require keeping two sets of books, that is, filing two inconsistent sets of paperwork.

== Solutions ==
When a short shipment or over shipment is noticed − most often by the recipient, although occasionally by the sender in the case of an error noticed post-shipment − the other party should be informed promptly, so corrective action can be taken. Such action could include supplemental shipments in the case of short shipments, returning merchandise in the case of over shipments, and issuing corrected invoices if the actual quantity is acceptable. Furthermore, one might carry out an investigation into the cause of the error to ensure that fraud or theft is not occurring through incorrect reporting or other means.
