= Uniform Customs and Practice for Documentary Credits =

International standard for drawing up letters of credit

The Uniform Customs and Practice for Documentary Credits (UCP) is a set of rules on the issuance and use of letters of credit. The UCP is utilized by bankers and commercial parties in more than 175 countries in trade finance. Some 11-15% of international trade utilizes letters of credit, totaling over a trillion dollars (US) each year.

Historically, the commercial parties, particularly banks, have developed the techniques and methods for handling letters of credit in international trade finance. This practice has been standardized by the International Chamber of Commerce (ICC) by initially publishing the UCP in 1933 and subsequently updating it throughout the years. The ICC has developed and moulded the UCP by regular revisions, the current version being the UCP 600. The result is the most successful international attempt at unifying rules ever, as the UCP has substantially universal effect. The latest revision was approved by the Banking Commission of the ICC at its meeting in Paris on 25 October 2006. This latest version, called the UCP 600, formally commenced on 1 July 2007.

As of July 2017, a decision had been made not to revise the 2007 version of UCP 600, although the ICC agreed that the need for a revision would be "kept under review".

== ICC and the UCP ==
A significant function of the ICC is the preparation and promotion of its uniform rules of practice. The ICC's aim is to provide a codification of international practice occasionally selecting the best practice after ample debate and consideration. The ICC rules of practice are designed by bankers and merchants and not by legislatures with political and local considerations. The rules accordingly demonstrate the needs, customs and practices of business. Because the rules are incorporated voluntarily into contracts, the rules are flexible while providing a stable base for international review, including judicial scrutiny. International revision is thus facilitated permitting the incorporation of the changing practices of the commercial parties. ICC, which was established in 1919, had as its primary objective facilitating the flow of international trade at a time when nationalism and protectionism threatened the easing of world trade. It was in that spirit that the UCP were first introduced – to alleviate the confusion caused by individual countries' promoting their own national rules on letter of credit practice. The aim was to create a set of contractual rules that would establish uniformity in practice, so that there would be less need to cope with often conflicting national regulations. The universal acceptance of the UCP by practitioners in countries with widely divergent economic and judicial systems is a testament to the rules' success.

There are two main principles which underlie the UCP:

- the principle of independence, which refers to the fact that a credit transaction is separate from the sale of goods or other form of contract financed by the credit facility;
- the principle that banks deal only in documents and not with the underlying exchange of property or other activity.

== UCP 600 ==
The latest (July 2007) revision of UCP is the sixth revision of the rules since they were first promulgated in 1933. It replaced UCP 500, and was the outcome of more than three years of work by the ICC's Commission on Banking Technique and Practice.

The UCP rules remain the most successful set of private rules for trade ever developed. A range of individuals and groups contributed to the current revision including: the UCP Drafting Group, which waded through more than 5000 individual comments before arriving at this final text; the UCP Consulting Group, consisting of members from more than 25 countries, which served as the advisory body; the more than 400 members of the ICC Commission on Banking Technique and Practice who made pertinent suggestions for changes in the text; and 130 ICC National Committees worldwide which took an active role in consolidating comments from their members.

During the revision process, notice was taken of the considerable work that had been completed in creating the International Standard Banking Practice for the Examination of Documents under Documentary Credits (ISBP), ICC Publication 745. This publication has evolved into a necessary companion to the UCP for determining compliance of documents with the terms of letters of credit. It is the expectation of the Drafting Group and the Banking Commission that the application of the principles contained in the ISBP, including subsequent revisions thereof, will continue during the time UCP 600 is in force. At the time UCP 600 is implemented, there will be an updated version of the ISBP (the most recent one being the 2013 revision) to bring its contents in line with the substance and style of the new rules.

Note that UCP 600 does not automatically apply to a credit if the credit is silent as to which set of rules it is subject to. A credit issued by SWIFT MT700 is no longer subject by default to the current UCP; it has to be indicated in field 40E, which is designated for specifying the "applicable rules".

Where a credit is issued subject to UCP 600, the credit will be interpreted in accordance with the entire set of 39 articles contained in UCP 600. However, exceptions to the rules can be made by express modification or exclusion. For example, the parties to a credit may agree that the rest of the credit shall remain valid despite the beneficiary's failure to deliver an installment. In such case, the credit has to nullify the effect of article 32 of UCP 600, such as by wording the credit as: "The credit will continue to be available for the remaining installments notwithstanding the beneficiary's failure to present complied documents of an installment in accordance with the installment schedule."

== eUCP ==
The eUCP was developed as a supplement to UCP due to the sense at the time that banks and corporates together with the transport and insurance industries were ready to use electronic commerce. The hope and expectation that surrounded the development of eUCP has failed the UCP 600 and it will remain as a supplement albeit slightly amended to identify its relationship with UCP 600.

An updated version of the eUCP came into effect in 2023.
