= Receipt =

Written acknowledgment that a person has received money or property in payment

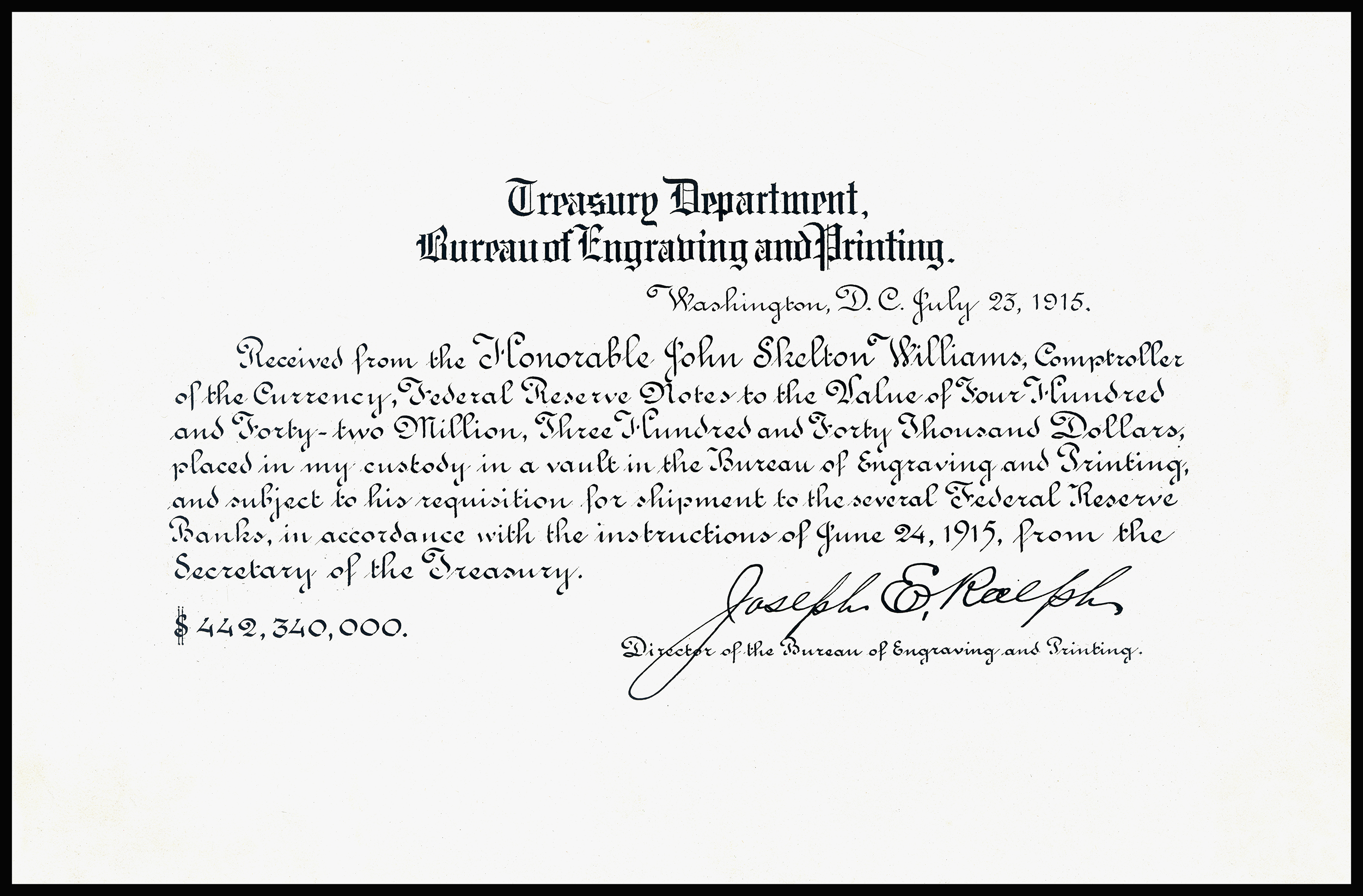
A Bureau of Engraving and Printing receipt for $442,340,000 in Federal Reserve Notes from Comptroller John Skelton Williams, dated 23 July 1915 and signed by Joseph E. Ralph, Director of the BEP

A receipt (also known as a packing list, packing slip, packaging slip, (delivery) docket, shipping list, delivery list, bill of the parcel, manifest, or customer receipt) is a document acknowledging that something has been received, such as money or property in payment following a sale or other transfer of goods or provision of a service. All receipts must have the date of purchase on them. If the recipient of the payment is legally required to collect sales tax or VAT from the customer, the amount would be added to the receipt, and the collection would be deemed to have been on behalf of the relevant tax authority. In many countries, a retailer is required to include the sales tax or VAT in the displayed price of goods sold, from which the tax amount would be calculated at the point of sale and remitted to the tax authorities in due course. Similarly, amounts may be deducted from amounts payable, as in the case of taxes withheld from wages. On the other hand, tips or other gratuities that are given by a customer, for example in a restaurant, would not form part of the payment amount or appear on the receipt.

In some countries, it is obligatory for a business to provide a receipt to a customer confirming the details of a transaction. In most cases, the recipient of money provides the receipt, but in some cases, the receipt is generated by the payer, as in the case of goods being returned for a refund. A receipt is not the same as an invoice.

There is usually no set form for a receipt, such as a requirement that it be machine-generated. Many point-of-sale terminals or cash registers can automatically produce receipts. Receipts may also be generated by accounting systems, be manually produced, or generated electronically, for example, if there is no face-to-face transaction. To reduce the cost of postage and processing, many businesses do not mail receipts to customers unless specifically requested or required by law, with some transmitting them electronically. Others, to reduce time and paper, may endorse an invoice, account, or statement as "paid".

== Process ==
=== Shop receipts ===
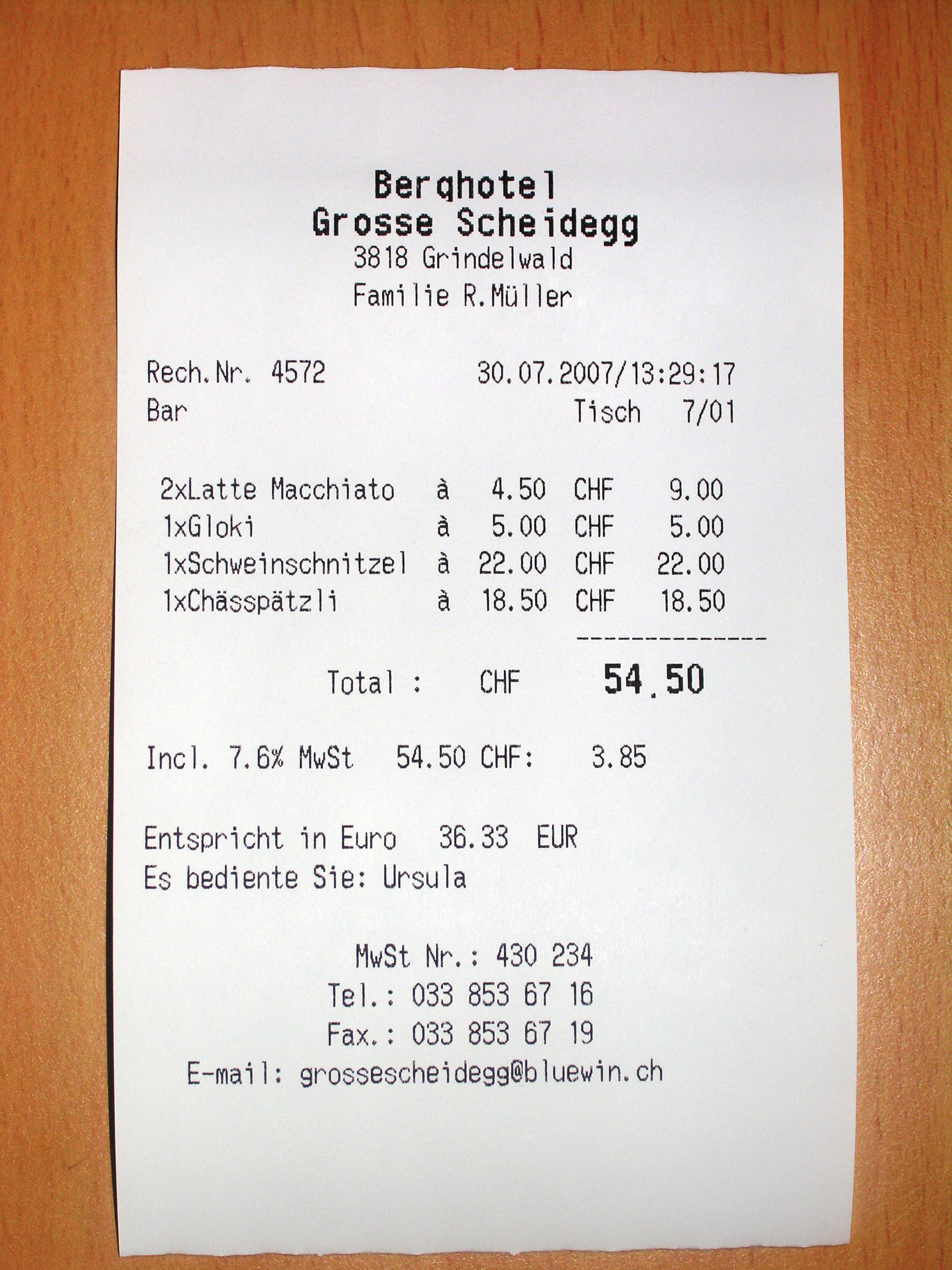
A receipt in German from a Swiss restaurant, which includes a list of purchased items, along with prices in two currencies and a 7.6% tax levied. Also included are contact and tax information about the business.

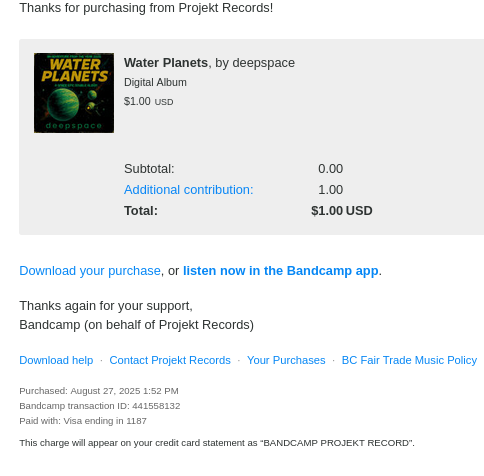
A digital receipt for an album bought at Bandcamp, which includes a list of purchased album, the subtotal, and the final price. Also included are date of purchase, transaction identifier, and payment card information.

The practice in most shops at the point of sale is for a salesperson to scan or record the price of a customer's proposed purchases, including tax, discounts, credits, and other adjustments. In traditional situations and still in some family businesses today, the salesperson would then show the customer the summary, the invoice, for their agreement; but many shops today bypass this stage. The practice of presenting an invoice is most common in restaurants where a "bill" is presented after a meal.

The salesperson would indicate to the customer (whether by way of an invoice or otherwise) the total amount payable, and the customer would indicate the proposed method of payment of the amount. Payment in cash is regarded as payment of the amount tendered, but payment by store account is not. After processing the payment, the salesperson would then generate in one document an invoice and receipt. If payment was made by a payment card, a payment record would normally also be generated.

The invoice and receipt are the printed record of the transaction and are legal documents. A copy of these documents would normally be handed to the customer, though this step may be dispensed with. In many countries, a retailer may be under a legal obligation to provide a receipt to a customer which shows the details of a transaction and the shop and other information so that the tax authority can check that sales and related taxes are not being hidden. The document may also include messages from the retailer, warranty or return details, special offers, advertisements, or coupons, but these are merely promotional and not part of the formal receipt.

=== Other receipts ===
Receipts may also be provided for non-retail operations such as banking transactions.

=== Barcodes ===
Shops that use barcode readers may generate receipts with a barcode of the receipt identification number, which enables a salesperson to scan the barcode and quickly retrieve the details of the original transaction, for example: if a customer seeks to return or exchange goods or there is some other query.

=== Customer history ===
If linked to a customer shop account, some retailers' point-of-sale systems also allow the salesperson to see a complete record of the customer's buying history. A receipt (or a copy of a receipt) is the proof of purchase usually needed to make a return and often plays a vital part in a company's return and exchange policy.

== Recipients ==
An invoice is sent to the person responsible for payment, while the shipping list (or packing slip) is included with the recipient’s shipment. The shipping list is included in the shipped box. In some scenarios, the same person will pay the bill and receive the shipment. However, someone may purchase and pay for a product to be delivered to another person (e.g., as a gift).

== Shipping or packing list details ==
Shipping or packing lists vary depending on the business and its products. Every shipment to a customer should contain a shipping or packing list with the order date, the products included, and the quantity of each product. Some businesses may include the weight of each product. Many recipients use them as checklists when unpacking their shipments. If something they ordered is missing or shipped in error, they alert the seller.

In Carlos Soto Sau v AP Moller-Maersk AS, a packing list for a fish shipment included a reference to a "rejection clause", which could have been treated as a reference to terms and conditions applicable to the contract of sale, but the person who received the packing list saw its only purpose as being "to confirm the number of cartons and weight of the goods" and, as no issues of ownership were alerted to him, the court held that he was entitled to use the packing list in this way.

== Manual receipts ==
Hand-written or hand-completed receipts are more often used for infrequent or irregular transactions, or for transactions conducted in the absence of a terminal, cash register or point of sale: for example, as provided by a landlord to a tenant to record the receipt of rent. They can also be required when company representatives buy goods, because tax deduction rules might require hand signed receipts.

== Related industries ==
Organizing receipts and similar financial documents is a multimillion-dollar industry in the United States. Consumers can use both desktop and online software to organize electronic receipts; sometimes, receipts are sent digitally from point of sale devices directly to consumers. The growing trend of digital receipts has led to the launch of new businesses focused on digital receipt management.

== See also ==
- Bill of lading
- Bill of materials
- Bill of sale
- Certificate of origin
- Delivery order
- Document
- Document automation
- Invoice
- Manifest (transportation)
- Short shipment
- Cash register
- Depositary receipt
- Document automation in supply chain management & logistics
- Special journals
- Point of sales
- Proof of purchase
- Return receipt
- Electronic receipt (E-receipt)
