= Electronic receipt =

Type of receipt in electronic format

An electronic receipt (e-receipt) is a receipt of any product or service that was purchased, stored in electronic form.

== Implementation ==
Digital receipts are normally sent via e-mail or via an app or via a scan of a QR-code that is displayed on a screen (cash register or payment terminal). Unlike paper receipts, e-receipts are used to reduce paper usage. These e-receipts are used to inform the customer of rebates and discounts. Another important purpose is to use the digital receipts as marketing instrument. Another reason for the use of e-receipts is business intelligence. Through the usage of these e-receipts, companies can track their customers easier in terms of purchases, which supports the business intelligence. Through this companies can adapt their marketing campaign towards the customers. The e-receipt helps to connect customers to their in-store purchases. Merchants can issue E-receipts using own mechanisms or use external services specialized on electronic payments.

Possible ways of distributing the email receipts may be to send an e-mail, an app, a website/web app, a QR-code or a BLE transmit on mobile. The general idea of the e-receipt remains the same, there are only different ways of distribution. There are many different companies that already offer their customers e-receipts. In the following part these different companies and technologies are compared and their pros and cons are discussed.

== Mandates ==
In January 2019, a California assemblyman introduced a proposed bill that would prohibit businesses from issuing customers paper receipts unless they explicitly request one.

== See also ==
- Electronic billing
- Electronic invoicing
- Electronic ticket
