= Pain of paying =

Negative emotions due to paying for a good or service

The pain of paying is a concept from behavioral economics and behavioral science, coined in 1996 by Ofer Zellermayer, whilst writing his PhD dissertation at the University of Carnegie Mellon, under supervision of George Loewenstein. The term refers to the negative emotions experienced during the process of paying for a good or service. In other words, the more a purchase hurts, the less people are willing to make this purchase. During the payment process, the handing over of money is akin to losing money. As most people are loss averse, this is experienced as a negative feeling, and as such can also be used to avoid or reduce spending. In 2023, Farnoush Reshadi and M. Paula Fitzgerald reviewed the literature on pain of payment and offered a new definition of pain of payment that distinguishes between two types of pain of payment: immediate and anticipated. Immediate pain of payment is “the negative psychological affective reaction consumers experience immediately after they become cognizant that they have lost a certain amount of their financial resources.” Anticipated pain of payment is “the negative psychological affective reaction consumers experience when they become cognizant that they will or may lose a certain amount of their financial resources in the future.” These new definitions consider that pain of payment can be experienced both after and before making payments, can be experienced when losing any type of financial resource that can act as a source of security (e.g., savings, investments), and is only evoked when consumers become aware of the financial loss. The pain of paying has been tested in several contexts, and has been found to differ per payment method. The pain of paying is often heralded as a tool to curb individuals' spending.

== Research on payment methods ==
The pain of paying is not equal among all payment methods. The original research by Ofer Zellermayer showed that when it came to the pain of paying, consumers preferred using methods of payment they ranked as the least painful. Bank deduction (direct debit) and credit card were preferred, whereas check and cash were judged to be the most painful, and the least preferred. The least painful payment methods were not only preferred, they were also the most frequently used.

=== Card payments ===
Zellermayer's dissertation is not the only research looking into the pain of paying as related to card payments. Applying the reduced pain of paying to credit cards would be able to explain the effects seen within credit card usage. Increased credit card usage, as compared to cash usage, has been linked to increased spending, less accurate expenditure recall, reduced impulse control leading to more frequent spending and debt accumulation. The pain of paying would account for these phenomena occurring by the reduced salience associated with lower levels of pain.

Notably different from normal card payments, in which signatures, swiping or PIN-verification is used, are contactless card payments. Looking exclusively at cards, research has found that individuals predominantly using contactless cards were less aware of their spending, were more likely to spend more and felt less in control over their spending. Aforementioned research found that levels of pain of paying across credit card and contactless cards were equally low, as compared to the levels of pain experienced when using cash.

=== Mobile payments ===
Research on the effect of mobile payments on the pain of paying has been done as well, showing that lower levels of pain are experienced when using phones and other gadgets to pay, as compared to cash, but also to cards. Other research has found similar effects, and attributes this to theories of multifunctionality, in which the pain of paying by a phone is reduced, as a phone is not exclusively used for payments, as such reducing the salience of the payment.

== Research on Individual Characteristics ==
In addition to the pain of paying not being constant across different methods of payment, it also does not hold constant across individuals. Research has shown that different types of people experience different levels of pain of paying, which can in turn affect spending decisions.

=== Spendthrift-Tightwad Scale ===
The first scale developed to account for individual differences within spending behaviour measured the divergence between one’s typical spending habits and one’s desired spending habits. Derived from this, a more detailed scale was developed to indicate how much pain was experienced during the process of spending, called the tightwad-spendthrift scale, where tightwads experience higher levels of the pain of paying, as compared to spendthrifts who experience lower levels of the pain of paying. Research has also looked into the possible effects of marketing on this scale: tightwads are particularly sensitive to marketing contexts that make spending less painful

== Neuroscientific Research ==
The pain of paying is not an exclusively behavioral phenomenon. Neuroscientific studies have shown that the pain of paying exists on a neural level. In addition to merely representing costs or loss in a rational sense, the “pain of paying” theory argues that price can elicit an aversive response akin to physical pain (Prelec and Loewenstein 1998, Rick et al. 2008). The results for nucleus accumbens (reward centre) and medial prefrontal cortex indicate that even if price primacy evoked pain early in the decision process, that pain did not systematically lower estimates of product value, nor did it prevent or decrease purchases If activity in the nucleus accumbens (reward centre) was unable to counteract the activity (pain experienced) in the insular cortex, the participant would not purchase the product in question, as paying was too "painful". Further research also contributed to showing that the pain of paying does exist on a neural level, showing that inducing the pain of paying can be done through priming and is resistant to placebo effects showed similar results

== Other Theories on Payment Methods ==
The pain of paying is not the only theory aiming to explain the different behaviours associated with different payment methods. Dilip Soman produced the framework of payment transparency, in which he argues that it is the transparency of the payment method, focusing on its reflection of value, that determines how salient, or painful, the payment is. The observations and predictions made by Soman closely align those of Zellermayer. Both relate to the degree of coupling (i.e., the strength of the dyadic relationship) between payment and consumption as influencing the severity of the pain of paying.

A second theory which looks into the effect of payment method on the pain of paying is the theory of decoupling, as proposed by Raghubir and Srivastava. Within this theory the coupling of payment and pain of paying refers to its concurrency. This theory too, is based on Zellermayer's concept that the pain of paying affects consumers' payment-time/mode preferences. The concurrency of payment method with paying (the good/service has to be paid for as it is obtained), determines its pain. Payment methods that don't allow for this concurrency are decoupled, and as such the pain of paying for the good/service is postponed, whereas the pleasure from obtaining the good/service is immediately experienced. The decoupling theory focuses predominantly on the different behaviours associated with credit card usage. Credit cards being the only method that allows for non-concurrent payment at the point of sale.
