= Traveller's cheque =

Medium of exchange

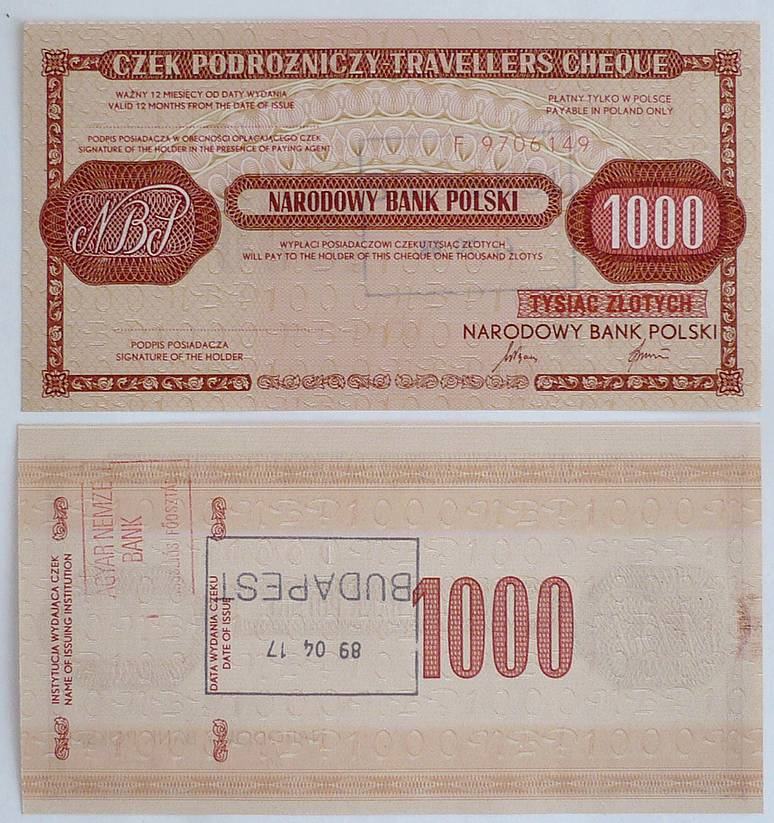
Obverse and reverse side of traveller's cheque of National Bank of Poland (nominal value: 1000 Polish złoty); sold in April 1989 in Budapest (Hungary), for use during travel to Poland only, never used

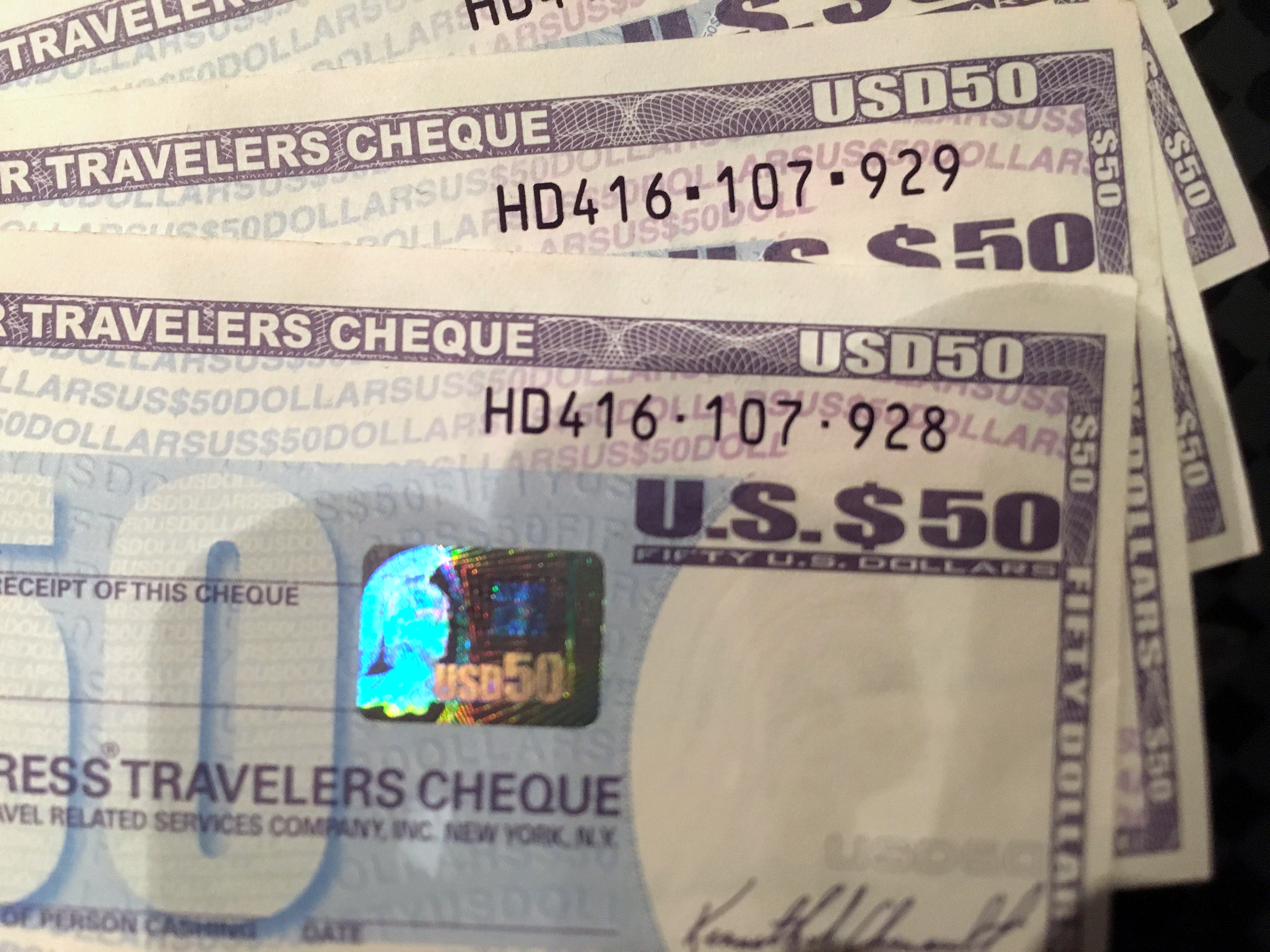
Security hologram against counterfeit on cheques with the denomination of 50 US dollars from American Express, c. 2012

A traveller's cheque (Note: Alternatively spelt as traveler's check, particularly in American English. See also American and British English spelling differences.) is a medium of exchange that can be used in place of the currency of a country. Each cheque is denominated in a preprinted fixed, round, amount of one of a number of major world currencies; it has two panels for a signature. The purchaser signs one panel of each cheque on receiving it; to use it, it is signed on the second panel and dated in the presence of the payee, who accepts it if the signatures match. It can then be deposited into a bank account in the same way as a normal cheque; payment was guaranteed if the signatures matched, even if a cheque had been used fraudulently, for example stolen, encouraging merchants to accept them routinely. While it was possible for the issuer to go out of business, invalidating cheques, most issuers were large, stable businesses.

Traveller's cheques were widely used from the 1850s to the 1990s by people travelling in foreign countries instead of cash, mainly before the introduction of payment cards and later electronic methods of payment. They were much safer for the traveller as their value would be reimbursed if stolen, unlike cash. A book of cheques of different amounts would be carried, to be cashed or spent as required. They could be exchanged for local currency at a bank, and many merchants accepted them as payment.

The financial institutions issuing traveller's cheques earn income in a number of ways. They charge a fee on sale of such cheques, and earn interest on purchased but as yet uncashed cheques, effectively an interest-free loan. Traveller's cheques in currencies different from the purchaser's applied a profitably unfavourable foreign exchange rate. The cheque issuer's exchange rate risk can be hedged with currency future contracts. Traveller's cheques were used before payment cards were introduced, and were more profitable to the issuer.

Their use has been in decline since technology introduced more convenient methods of payment, starting with payment cards (credit, debit, and pre-paid currency cards), money transfer services, automated teller machines that accept foreign cards, and ultimately electronic payment methods. Also, as interest rates sharply declined in many developed countries in the late 20th and early 21st centuries, traveller's cheques became less profitable and were scaled back or discontinued. The rise of more convenient methods of payment led to traveller's cheques no longer being widely accepted in payment or cashed. Cheques issued have unlimited validity, and can always be cashed by their issuer so long as it is still in business, even if issuing has ceased.

== Terminology ==
Legally, the parties to traveller's cheque transactions are as follows. The organisation that produces a traveller's cheque is the obligor or issuer. The bank or other place that sells it is the agent of the issuer. The natural person who buys the cheque is the purchaser. The entity to whom the purchaser hands the cheque in payment for goods or services is the payee or merchant. For purposes of clearance, the obligor is both maker and drawee.

== History ==
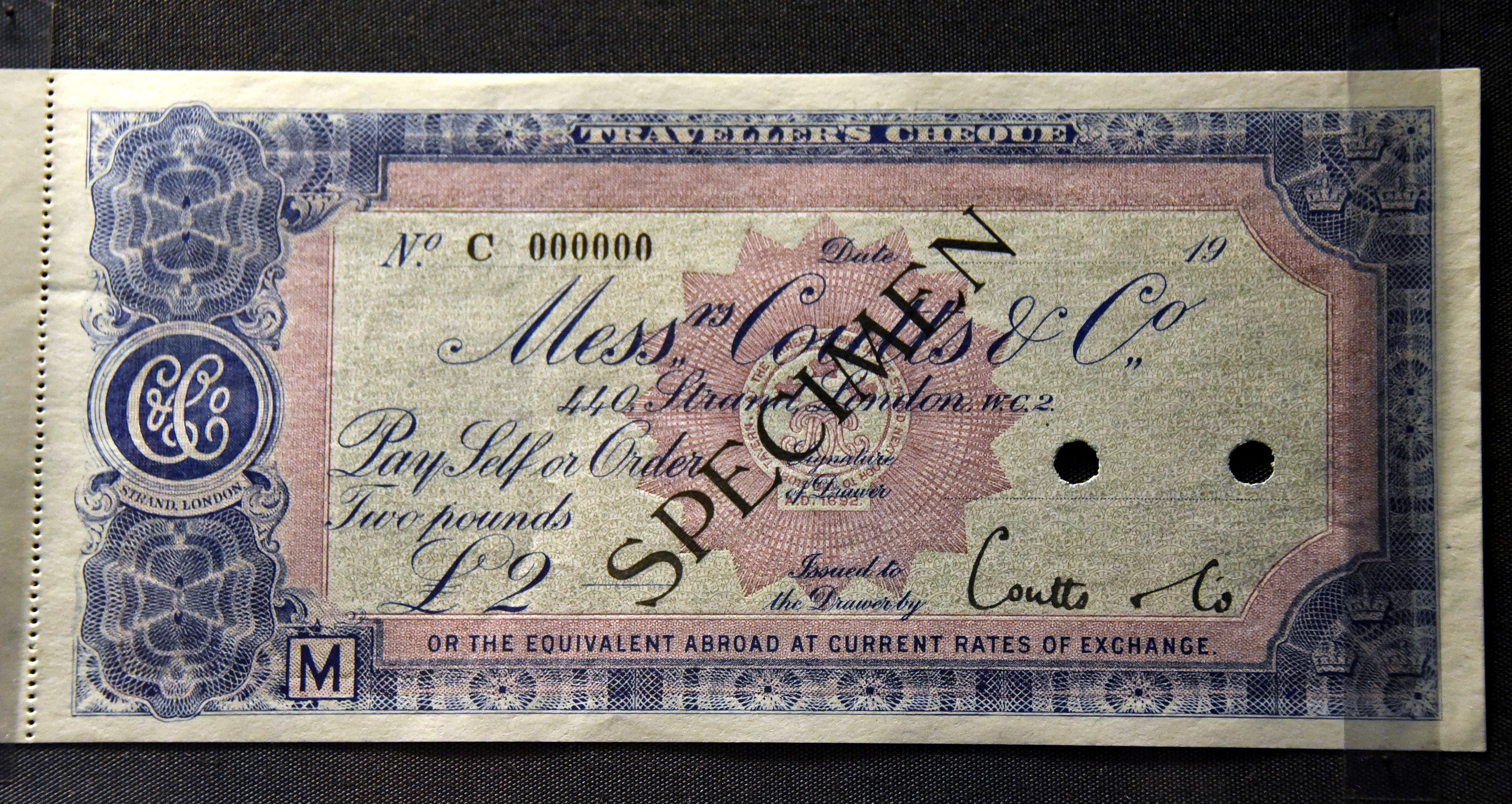
Coutts & Co. traveller's cheque, for 2 pounds. Issued in London, 1970s. Langmead Collection. On display at the British Museum in London.

Traveller's cheques were first issued on 1 January 1772 by the London Credit Exchange Company for use in 90 European cities, and in 1874, Thomas Cook was issuing "circular notes" that operated in the manner of traveller's cheques.

American Express developed a large-scale international traveller's cheque system in 1891, to supersede the traditional letters of credit. American Express's introduction of traveller's cheques is traditionally attributed to employee Marcellus Flemming Berry, after company president J. C. Fargo had problems in smaller European cities obtaining funds with a letter of credit.

Between the 1850s and the 1990s, traveller's cheques became one of the main ways that people took money on holiday for use in foreign countries without the risks associated with carrying large amounts of cash. They also had the advantage of being available in smaller denominations for travelers of more modest means, in an era when the well off tended to carry letters of credit.

Several companies introduced traveller's cheques; the most familiar of those in the 20th century were Thomas Cook Group, Bank of America and American Express.

== Usage ==
=== Purchasing cheques ===
Traveller's cheques are sold by banks and agencies to customers for use at a later time. Upon obtaining custody of a purchased supply of traveller's cheques, the purchaser immediately signs each cheque. The purchaser also receives a receipt and other documentation that should be kept in a safe place other than where they carry the cheques. Traveller's cheques can usually be replaced if lost or stolen by providing the receipt issued with their purchase, showing the serial numbers allocated.

=== Using cheques ===
To make a purchase or cash a cheque, the purchaser, in the presence of the payee, dates and countersigns the cheque.

=== Denomination and change ===
Traveller's cheques are available in several currencies such as US dollars, Canadian dollars, pounds sterling, Japanese yen, Chinese yuan and euros; denominations usually being 20, 50, or 100 (× 100 for yen) of whatever currency, and are usually sold in pads of five or ten cheques, e.g., 5 × €20 for €100. Traveller's cheques do not expire, so unused cheques can be kept by the purchaser to spend at any time in the future. The purchaser of a supply of traveller's cheques effectively gives an interest-free loan to the issuer, which is why it is common for banks to sell them "commission free" to their customers. The commission, where it is charged, is usually 1–2% of the total face value sold.

Any change for a purchase transaction would usually be given in the local currency.

A payee receiving a traveller's cheque would follow its normal procedures for depositing cheques into its bank account. Where the payee is equipped to process cheques electronically (see: US Check 21 Act), this can normally be done with traveller's cheques.

== Security issues ==
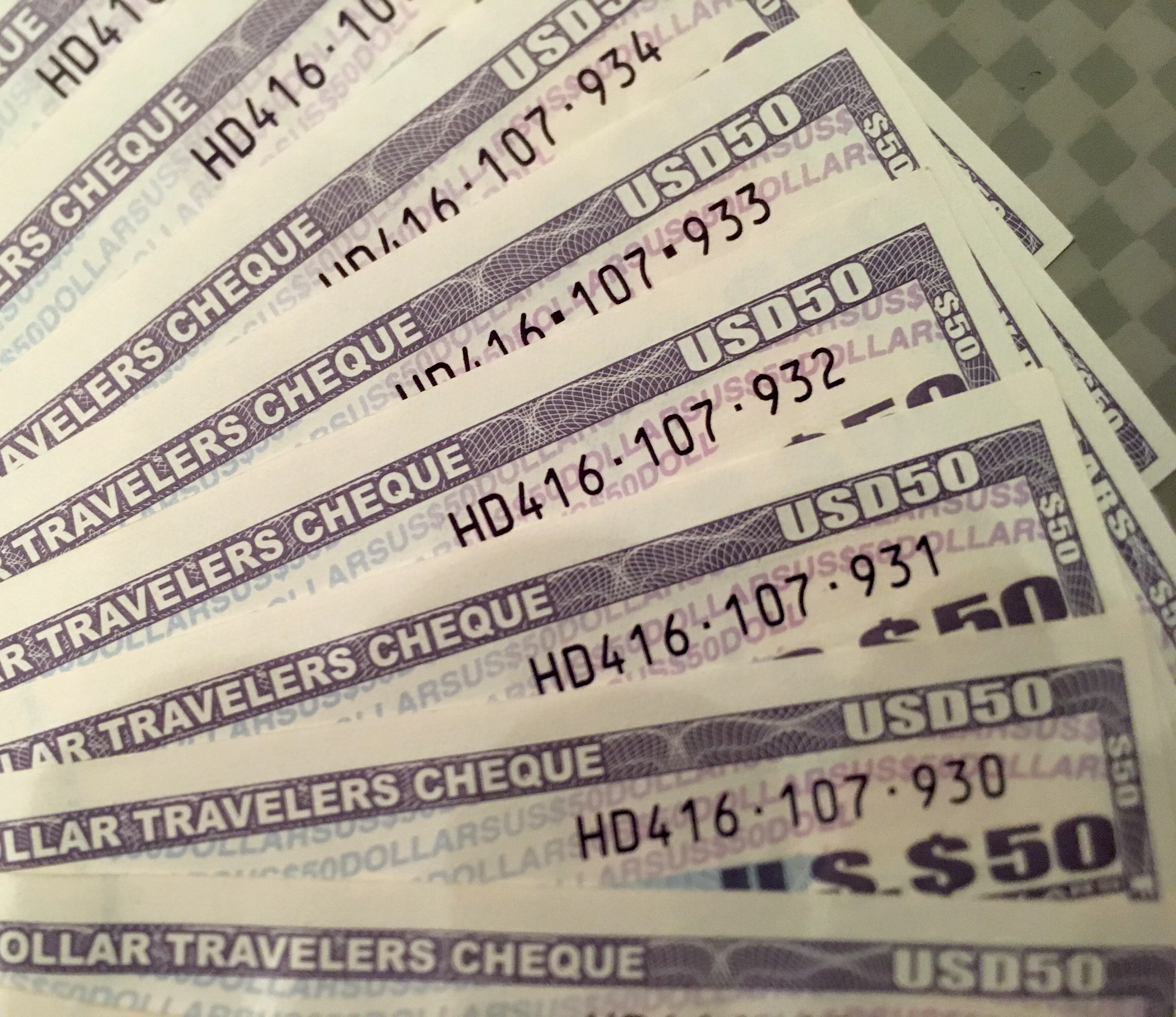
A number of American Express cheques bought at the same time at a bank in 2012, which show one of the safety features - the consecutive serial numbers. The buyer gets a printed list with the numbers, and when cashing one or more, they mark those on the list. When the rest is lost or stolen, the list serves as proof of the fact which cheques were already cashed.

One of the main advantages traveller's cheques provide is replacement if lost or stolen.

However, this has created an opportunity for fraud: a thief buys traveller's cheques, sells them at a lower price than their face value, and falsely reports the cheques stolen. The cost of buying the cheques is refunded, and the price they were fraudulently sold at is the thief's profit.

Some purchasers have found the process of filing a claim for lost or stolen cheques to be cumbersome, and several report being left without recourse after their cheques were lost or stolen and their claims refused.

== Alternatives ==
Most modern forms of payment can be used internationally; in particular, payment cards. In 2005, American Express released the American Express Travelers Cheque Card, a stored-value card that serves the same purposes as a traveller's cheque, but can be used in stores like a credit card. It discontinued the card in October 2007. A number of other financial companies went on to issue stored-value or pre-paid debit cards containing several currencies that could be used like credit or debit cards at shops and at ATMs, mimicking the traveller's cheque in electronic form. One of the major examples is the Visa TravelMoney card.

== See also ==
- Cashier's check
- Certified check
- Circular letter of credit
- Eurocheque
- Money order
