= Letter of credit =

Document issued by a financial institution

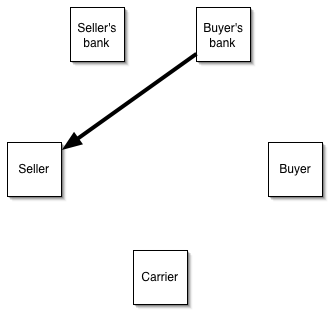
Image 1: After a contract is concluded between a buyer and a seller, the buyer's bank supplies a letter of credit to the seller.

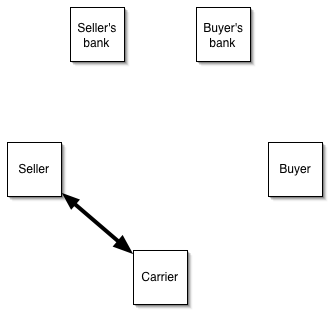
Image 2: The seller consigns the goods to a carrier in exchange for a bill of lading.

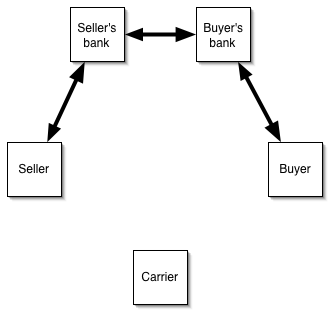
Image 3: The seller provides the bill of lading to the bank in exchange for payment. The seller's bank then provides the bill to buyer's bank, who provides the bill to buyer for presentation.

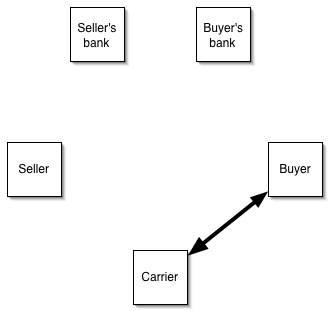
Image 4: The buyer provides the bill of lading to the carrier and takes delivery of the goods.

A letter of credit (LC), also known as a documentary credit or bankers commercial credit, or letter of undertaking (LoU), is a payment mechanism used in international trade to provide an economic guarantee from a creditworthy bank to an exporter of goods. Letters of credit are used extensively in the financing of international trade, when the reliability of contracting parties cannot be readily and easily determined. Its economic effect is to introduce a bank as an underwriter that assumes the counterparty risk of the buyer paying the seller for goods.

Typically, after a sales contract has been negotiated, and the buyer and seller have agreed that a letter of credit will be used as the method of payment, the applicant will contact a bank to ask for a letter of credit to be issued. Once the issuing bank has assessed the buyer's credit risk, it will issue the letter of credit, meaning that it will provide a promise to pay the seller upon presentation of certain documents. Once the beneficiary (the seller) receives the letter of credit, it will check the terms to ensure that it matches with the contract and will either arrange for shipment of the goods or ask for an amendment to the letter of credit so that it meets with the terms of the contract. The letter of credit is limited in terms of time, the validity of credit, the last date of shipment, and how late after shipment the documents may be presented to the nominated bank.

Once the goods have been shipped, the beneficiary will present the requested documents to the nominated bank. This bank will check the documents, and if they comply with the terms of the letter of credit, the issuing bank is bound to honor the terms of the letter of credit by paying the beneficiary.

If the documents do not comply with the terms of the letter of credit, they are considered discrepant. At this point, the nominated bank will inform the beneficiary of the discrepancy and offer a number of options depending on the circumstances after consent of applicant. However, such a discrepancy must be more than trivial. Refusal cannot depend on anything other than reasonable examination of the documents themselves. The bank then must rely on the fact that there was, in fact, a material mistake. A fact that if true would entitle the buyer to reject the items. A wrong date such as an early delivery date was held by English courts to not be a material mistake. If the discrepancies are minor, it may be possible to present corrected documents to the bank to make the presentation compliant. Failure of the bank to pay is grounds for a chose in action. Documents presented after the time limits mentioned in the credit, however, are considered discrepant.

If the corrected documents cannot be supplied in time, the documents may be forwarded directly to the issuing bank in trust; effectively in the hope that the applicant will accept the documents. Documents forwarded in trust remove the payment security of a letter of credit so this route must only be used as a last resort.

Some banks will offer to "Telex for approval" or similar. This is where the nominated bank holds the documents, but sends a message to the issuing bank asking if discrepancies are acceptable. This is more secure than sending documents in trust.

== History ==
The letter of credit has been used in Europe since ancient times. Letters of credit were traditionally governed by internationally recognized rules and procedures rather than by national law. The International Chamber of Commerce oversaw the preparation of the first Uniform Customs and Practice for Documentary Credits (UCP) in 1933, creating a voluntary framework for commercial banks to apply to transactions worldwide.

In the late 19th century and early 20th century, travelers commonly carried a circular letter of credit issued by a relationship bank, which allowed the beneficiary to withdraw cash from other banks along their journey. This type of letter of credit was eventually replaced by traveler's checks, credit cards and automated teller machines.

Although letters of credit first existed only as paper documents, they were regularly issued by telegraph in the late 19th century, and by telex in the latter half of the 20th century. Beginning in 1973 with the creation of SWIFT, banks began to migrate to electronic data interchange as a means of controlling costs, and in 1983 the UCP was amended to allow "teletransmission" of letters of credit. By the 21st century, the vast majority of LCs were issued in electronic form and entirely "paperless". LCs were becoming more common. Marcell David Reich (commonly known as Marc Rich) popularised the use of letters of credit in the oil trade.

== Terminology ==
UCP 600 (2007 Revision) regulates common market practice within the letter of credit market. It defines a number of terms related to letters of credit which categorise the various factors within any given transaction. These are crucial to understanding the role financial institutions play. These include:

- The applicant is the person or company who has requested the letter of credit to be issued; this will normally be the buyer.
- The beneficiary is the person or company who will be paid under the letter of credit; this will normally be the seller (UCP600 Article 2 defines the beneficiary as "the party in whose favour a credit is issued").
- The issuing bank is the bank that issues the credit, usually following a request from an applicant.
- The nominated bank is a bank mentioned within the letter of credit at which the credit is available (in this respect, UCP600 Article 2 reads: "Nominated bank means the bank with which the credit is available or any bank in the case of a credit available with any bank").
- The advising bank is the bank that will inform the beneficiary or their nominated bank of the credit, send the original credit to the beneficiary or their nominated bank, and provide the beneficiary or their nominated bank with any amendments to the letter of credit.
- Confirmation is an undertaking from a bank other than the issuing bank to pay the beneficiary for a complying presentation, allowing the beneficiary to further reduce payment risk, although confirmation is usually at an extra cost.
- A confirming bank is a bank other than the issuing bank that adds its confirmation to credit upon the issuing bank's authorization or request thus providing more security to the beneficiary.
- A complying presentation is a set of documents that meet with the requirements of the letter of credit and all of the rules relating to letters of credit.

== Function ==
A letter of credit is an important payment method in international trade and used worldwide. It is particularly useful where the buyer and seller may not know each other personally and are separated by distance, differing laws in each country, and different trading customs. It is a primary method in international trade to mitigate the risk a seller of goods takes when providing those goods to a buyer. It does this by ensuring that the seller is paid for presenting the documents which are specified in the contract for sale between the buyer and the seller. That is to say, a letter of credit is a payment method used to discharge the legal obligations for payment from the buyer to the seller, by having a bank pay the seller directly. Thus, the seller relies on the credit risk of the bank, rather than the buyer, to receive payment. As will be seen, and is observed in Image 2, the bank will pay the seller the value of the goods when the seller provides negotiable instruments, documents which themselves represent the goods. Upon presentation of the documents, the goods will traditionally be in the control of the issuing bank, which provides them security against the risk that the buyer (who had instructed the bank to pay the seller) will repay the bank for making such a payment.

In the event that the buyer is unable to make payment on the purchase, the seller may make a demand for payment on the bank. The bank will examine the beneficiary's demand and if it complies with the terms of the letter of credit, will honor the demand. Most letters of credit are governed by rules promulgated by the International Chamber of Commerce known as Uniform Customs and Practice for Documentary Credits. The current version, UCP 600, became effective July 1, 2007. Banks will typically require collateral from the purchaser for issuing a letter of credit and will charge a fee which is often a percentage of the amount covered by the letter of credit.

=== Types ===
Several categories of LCs exist which seek to operate in different markets and solve different issues. Examples of these include:

- Import vs export (commercial): The same credit can be termed an import or export letter of credit depending on whose perspective is considered. For the importer it is termed an import LC and for the exporter of goods an export LC.
- Revocable vs irrevocable: Whether an LC is revocable or irrevocable determines whether the buyer and the issuing bank are able to manipulate the LC or make corrections without informing or getting permissions from the seller. According to UCP 600, all LCs are irrevocable, hence in practice the revocable type of LC is increasingly obsolete. Any changes (amendment) or cancellation of the LC (except when expired) is done by the applicant (buyer) through the issuing bank. It must be authenticated and approved by the beneficiary (seller).
- Confirmed vs unconfirmed: An LC is said to be confirmed when a second bank adds its confirmation (or guarantee) to honor a complying presentation at the request or authorization of the issuing bank.
- Restricted vs unrestricted: Either the one advising bank can purchase a bill of exchange from the seller in the case of a restricted LC, or the confirmation bank is not specified, which means that the exporter can show the bill of exchange to any bank and receive a payment on an unrestricted LC.
- Deferred vs usance: A credit that is not paid or assigned immediately after presentation, but after an indicated period that is accepted by both buyer and seller. Typically, seller allows buyer to pay the required money after taking the related goods and selling them.

Additionally, a letter of credit may also have specific terms relating to the payment conditions which relate to the underlying reference documents. Some of these include:

- At sight: A credit that the announcer bank immediately pays after inspecting the carriage documents from the seller.
- Red clause: Before sending the products, seller can take the pre-paid part of the money from the bank. The first part of the credit is to attract the attention of the accepting bank. The first time the credit is established by the assigner bank, is to gain the attention of the offered bank. The terms and conditions were typically written in red ink, thus the name.
- Back-to-back: A pair of LCs in which one is to the benefit of a seller who is unable to provide the corresponding goods for unspecified reasons. In that event, a second credit is opened for another seller to provide the desired goods. Back-to-back is issued to facilitate intermediary trade. Intermediate companies such as trading houses are sometimes required to open LCs for suppliers and receive export LCs from buyers.
- Standby letter of credit (SBLC): Operates like a commercial letter of credit, except that typically it is retained as a standby instead of being the intended payment mechanism. In other words, this is an LC which is intended to provide a source of payment in the event of non-performance of contract. This is a security against an obligation which is not performed. If the bank is presented with demands of non-payment it is not a guarantee; the trigger is not non-payment but documentation. UCP600 Article 1 provides that the UCP applies to standby LCs; ISP98 applies specifically to standby letters of credit; and the United Nations Convention on Independent Guarantees and Standby Letters of Credit applies to a small number of countries that have ratified the convention.
- Acceptance credit: The bank accepts a bill of exchange, guaranteeing its payment when it matures if conditions are met, and discounts it.

==== Transferability ====
The exporter has the right to make the credit available to one or more subsequent beneficiaries. Credits are made transferable when the original beneficiary is a "middleman", who does not supply the documents himself, but procures either goods or documents from other suppliers and arranges for them to be sent to the issuing bank. A letter of credit can be transferred to the second beneficiary at the request of the first beneficiary only if it expressly states that the letter of credit is transferable. A bank is not obligated to transfer a credit. It can further be transferred to more than one alternate beneficiary as long as it allows partial shipments. The terms and conditions of the original credit must be replicated exactly in the transferred credit. However, to keep the workability of the transferable letter of credit, some figures can be reduced or curtailed, including:

- Amount
- Unit price of the merchandise (if stated)
- Expiry date
- Presentation period
- Latest shipment date or given period for shipment.

The first beneficiary may demand from the transferring bank to substitute for the applicant. However, if a document other than the invoice must be issued in a way to show the applicant's name, in such a case that requirement must indicate that in the transferred credit it will be free. Transferred credit cannot be transferred again to a third beneficiary at the request of the second beneficiary.

In some cases, the middleman does not want the buyer and supplier to know each other. The middleman is entitled to substitute his own invoice for the supplier's and acquire the difference as profit.

=== Documents that may be requested ===
To receive payment, an exporter or shipper must present the documents required by the LC. Typically the letter of credit will request an original bill of lading as the use of a title document such as this is critical to the functioning of the letter of credit. However, the list and form of documents is open to negotiation and might contain requirements to present documents issued by a neutral third-party evidencing the quality of the goods shipped, or their place of origin or place. Typical types of documents in such contracts might include:

- Financial documents — bill of exchange, co-accepted draft
- Commercial documents — invoice, packing list
- Shipping documents — bill of lading (ocean or multi-modal or charter party), airway bill, lorry/truck receipt, railway receipt, CMC other than mate receipt, forwarder cargo receipt
- Official documents — license, embassy legalization, origin certificate, inspection certificate, phytosanitary certificate
- Insurance documents — insurance policy or certificate, but not a cover note.

The range of documents that may be requested by the applicant is vast and varies considerably by country and commodity. Several methods of verifying the documents exist. A documentary credit provides security for both buyer and seller. Outlined in the UCP 600, the bank will give an undertaking (or promise), on behalf of buyer (who is often the applicant) to pay the beneficiary the value of the goods shipped if acceptable documents are submitted and if the stipulated terms and conditions are strictly complied with. The buyer can be confident that the goods he is expecting only will be received since it will be evidenced in the form of certain documents, meeting the specified terms and conditions. The supplier finds his confidence in the fact that if such stipulations are met, he will receive payment from the issuing bank, who is independent of the parties to the contract. In some cases, a letter of credit will require the documents to be collected. Another form of payment is the direct payment where the supplier ships the goods and waits for the buyer to pay, on open account terms.

=== Risk exposure ===
Letters of Credit are often used in international transactions to ensure that payment will be received where the buyer and seller may not know each other and are operating in different countries. In this case, the seller is exposed to a number of risks such as credit risk, and legal risk caused by the distance, differing laws and difficulty in knowing each party personally. Some of the other risks inherent in international trade include:

==== Fraud ====
The payment will be obtained for nonexistent or worthless merchandise against presentation by the beneficiary of forged or falsified documents.

==== Legal risks ====
There is the possibility that performance of a documentary credit may be disturbed by legal action relating directly to the parties and their rights and obligations under the documentary credit or performance may be prevented by government action outside the control of the parties. Alternatively, performance of a contract – including an obligation under a documentary credit relationship – could also be prevented by external factors such as natural disasters or armed conflicts. These risks, however, are often seen as secondary to the risk of non-payment.

==== Applicant ====
Several risks could relate to the parties of the applicant themselves. These may include situations where there is a non-delivery of Goods, Short shipment, the goods are of inferior quality, are damaged, or are late. The applicant is also exposed to the failure of the bank to make payment.

==== Issuing bank ====
The issuing bank is also exposed to risks which it may seek to mitigate through various techniques. It will be exposed to the insolvency risk of the applicant, that is, the risk the applicant runs insolvent before it is able to repay the letter of credit. Secondly, the bank will be exposed to a risk of fraud by the seller, who may provide incorrect or falsified documents to receive payment. If the bank ought to have known that the documents were a fraud, then the bank will be exposed to a fraud.

==== Beneficiary ====
The beneficiary will be exposed to the risk of its own failure to comply with credit conditions or failure of, or delays in payment from, the issuing bank. These risks are considered remote. Crucially, the beneficiary is not exposed to the risks of set-off by the applicant where the goods are damaged or are of inferior quality. While he may be sued by the applicant at a later point, the issuing bank cannot reduce the payment owed to correspond with the damage occurred. This is crucial in mitigating the risk to insolvency. Crucial to a letter of credit is the beneficiary's (the seller) attempt to isolate itself from the credit risk of the buyer. That is to say, it is concerned primarily with the ability of the buyer to pay for the goods.

=== Pricing ===
Issuance charges, covering negotiation, reimbursements and other charges are paid by the applicant or as per the terms and conditions of the LC. If the LC does not specify charges, they are paid by the applicant. Charge-related terms are indicated in field 71B.

== Legal principles ==
The fundamental principle of all letters of credit is that letters of credit deal with documents and not with goods. The payment obligation is independent from the underlying contract of sale or any other contract in the transaction. The bank's obligation is defined by the terms of the LC alone, and the contract of sale is not considered.

The specified documents are often bills of lading or other 'documentary intangibles' which 'A' and 'B' have previously specified in their original contract.

The actions available to the buyer arising out of the sale contract do not concern the bank and in no way affect its liability. Article 4(a) of the UCP600 states this principle clearly. This is confirmed within the market-practice documents stated by Article 5 of UCP600. As is a core tenet of financial law, market practice comprises a substantial portion of how parties behave. Accordingly, if the documents tendered by the beneficiary or their agent are in order, then, in general, the bank is obliged to pay without further qualifications.

As a result, it is the issuing bank who bears the risk that is linked with non-payment of the buyer. This is advantageous because the issuing bank often has a personal banking relationship with the buyer. The whole commercial purpose for which the system of confirmed irrevocable documentary credits has been developed in international trade is to give to the seller an assured right to be paid before he parts with control of the goods under sale.

It further prohibits any dispute with the buyer as to the performance of the contract of sale being used as a ground for non-payment or reduction or deferment of payment.

The only exception to this may be fraud. For example, a dishonest seller may present documents which comply with the letter of credit and receive payment, only for it to be later discovered that the documents are fraudulent and the goods are not in accordance with the contract. This would place the risk on the buyer, but it also means that the issuing bank must be stringent in assessing whether the presenting documents are legitimate.

Similar to other financial law instruments, a letter of credit utilises several legal concepts to achieve the economic effect of shifting the legal exposure from the seller to the buyer. The policies behind adopting this principle of abstraction are purely commercial. Whilst the bank is under an obligation to identify that the correct documents exist, they are not expected to examine whether the documents themselves are valid. That is to say, the bank is not responsible for investigating the underlying facts of each transaction, whether the goods are of the sufficient – and specified – quality or quantity.

Because the transaction operates on a negotiable instrument, it is the document itself which holds the value - not the goods to which the reference. This means that the bank need only be concerned with whether the document fulfils the requirements stipulated in the letter of credit.

Documents required under the LC, could in certain circumstances, be different from those required under the sale transaction. This would place banks in a dilemma in deciding which terms to follow if required to look behind the credit agreement. Since the basic function of the credit is to provide a seller with the certainty of payment for documentary duties, it would seem necessary that banks should honor their obligation in spite of any buyer allegations of misfeasance. If this were not the case, financial institutions would be much less inclined to issue documentary credits because of the risk, inconvenience, and expense involved in determining the underlying goods.

Financial institutions do not act as 'middlemen' but rather, as paying agents on behalf of the buyer. Courts have emphasized that buyers always have a remedy for an action upon the contract of sale and that it would be a calamity for the business world if a bank had to investigate every breach of contract.

With the UCP 600 rules the ICC sought to make the rules more flexible, suggesting that data in a document "need not be identical to, but must not conflict with data in that document, any other stipulated document, or the credit", as a way to account for any minor documentary errors. If this were not the case, the bank would be entitled to withhold payment even if the deviation is purely technical or even typographical.

However, in practice, many banks still hold to the principle of strict compliance, since it offers concrete guarantees to all parties. The general legal maxim de minimis non curat lex (literally "The law does not concern itself with trifles") has no place in the field.

However, whilst the details of the letter of credit can be understood with some flexibility the banks must adhere to the “principle of strict compliance” when determining whether the documents presented are those specified in the letter of credit. This is done to make the banks' duty of effecting payment against documents easy, efficient and quick.

=== Legal basis ===
Legal writers have failed to satisfactorily reconcile the bank's obligation to pay on behalf of the applicant with any contractually-founded, academic analysis. That is to say, they have not examined legal effect of the banks obligation through a conclusive theoretical lens. This has produced several conflicting theories as to the contractual effect of a letter of credit. Some theorists suggest that the obligation to pay arises through the implied promise, assignment, novation, reliance, agency, estoppel and even trust and the guarantees. Although documentary credits are enforceable once communicated to the beneficiary, it is difficult to show any consideration given by the beneficiary to the banker prior to the tender of documents. In such transactions the undertaking by the beneficiary to deliver the goods to the applicant is not sufficient consideration for the bank's promise because the contract of sale is made before the issuance of the credit, thus consideration in these circumstances is past. However, the performance of an existing duty under a contract may be a valid consideration for a new promise made by the bank, provided that there is some practical benefit to the bank. A promise to perform owed to a third party may also constitute a valid consideration.

It might also be feasible to typify letters of credit as a collateral contract for a third-party beneficiary, because three different entities participate in the transaction: the seller, the buyer, and the banker. Jean Domat suggests that because letters of credit are prompted by the buyer's necessity, the cause of an LC is to release the buyer of his obligation to pay directly to the seller. Therefore, an LC theoretically fits as a collateral contract accepted by conduct or in other words, an implied-in-fact contract where the buyer participates as the third party beneficiary with the bank acting as the stipulator and the seller as the promisor. The term beneficiary is not used properly in the scheme of an LC because a beneficiary (also, in trust law, cestui que use) in the broadest sense is a natural person or other legal entity who receives money or other benefits from a benefactor. Note that under the scheme of letters of credit, banks are neither benefactors of sellers nor benefactors of buyers and the seller receives no money in gratuity mode. Thus is possible that a "letter of credit" was one of those contracts that needed to be masked to disguise the "consideration or privity requirement". As a result, this kind of arrangement would make letter of credit to be enforceable under the action assumpsit because of its promissory connotation.

A few countries have created statutes in relation to letters of credit. For example, most jurisdictions in the United States (U.S.) have adopted Article 5 of the Uniform Commercial Code (UCC). These statutes are designed to work with the rules of market practice including UCP and ISP98. These rules of practice are incorporated into the transaction by agreement of the parties. The latest version of the UCP is the UCP600 effective July 1, 2007. Since the UCP are not laws, parties have to include them into their arrangements as normal contractual provisions. However, they still form a substantial part of market practice and crucially underpin financial law.

== National laws ==
=== Germany ===
Bürgerliches Gesetzbuch, the German civil code, does not directly address letters of credit. German case law indicates that the relationship between the issuing bank and customer is a contract for execution of a transaction, while the relationship between the issuing bank and the beneficiary is a promise of a debt.

=== Switzerland ===
The Swiss Civil Code of 1911 did not directly address letters of credit, which were still rare in the country at the time. Courts eventually dealt with the device by treating it as a hybrid of a mandate (Auftrag) and authorization-to-pay contract (Anweisung).

=== United States ===
Letters of credit came into general domestic use in the United States during World War I, although they had been used in American foreign trade for some time prior. The state of New York has historically had the most substantial and consistent body of case law in the United States with regard to letters of credit, due to the prominence of New York banks in international trade. The New York Bankers [sic] Commercial Credit Conference of 1920 provided the first set of voluntary LC regulations for major banks in the United States, but these banks transitioned to the international UCP standard by 1938.

Article 5 of the Uniform Commercial Code, drafted in 1952, provided a basis for codifying many UCP principles into state law and created one of the only extensive specific legal regulations of letters of credit worldwide, although the UCC rules do not cover all aspects of letters of credit. New York effectively subjugated the UCC rules to the existing UCP rules, and as a result the UCP rules continued to govern letters of credit under New York law. Article 5 was revised in 1995 to reflect the latest international practices as codified in the UCP.

== Use in fraud ==
Letters of credit are sometimes used to defraud banks through presentment of false documentation indicating that goods were shipped when they actually were not. Letters of credit are also sometimes used as part of fraudulent investment schemes.

In the international banking system, a letter of undertaking (LOU) is a provisional bank guarantee, under which a bank allows its customer to raise money from another bank's foreign branch in the form of short-term credit. The LOU serves the purpose of a bank guarantee. However, to be able to raise the LOU, the customer is supposed to pay margin money to the bank issuing the LOU and accordingly, he is granted a credit limit. In 2018, PNB suffered from such a breach of documentation protocols.

== See also ==
- Bank payment obligation
- Buyer's credit
- Circular letter of credit
- Documentary collection
- Uniform Customs and Practice for Documentary Credits
- Financial law
