= Vimianzo =

- Municipality
- Concello de Vimianzo
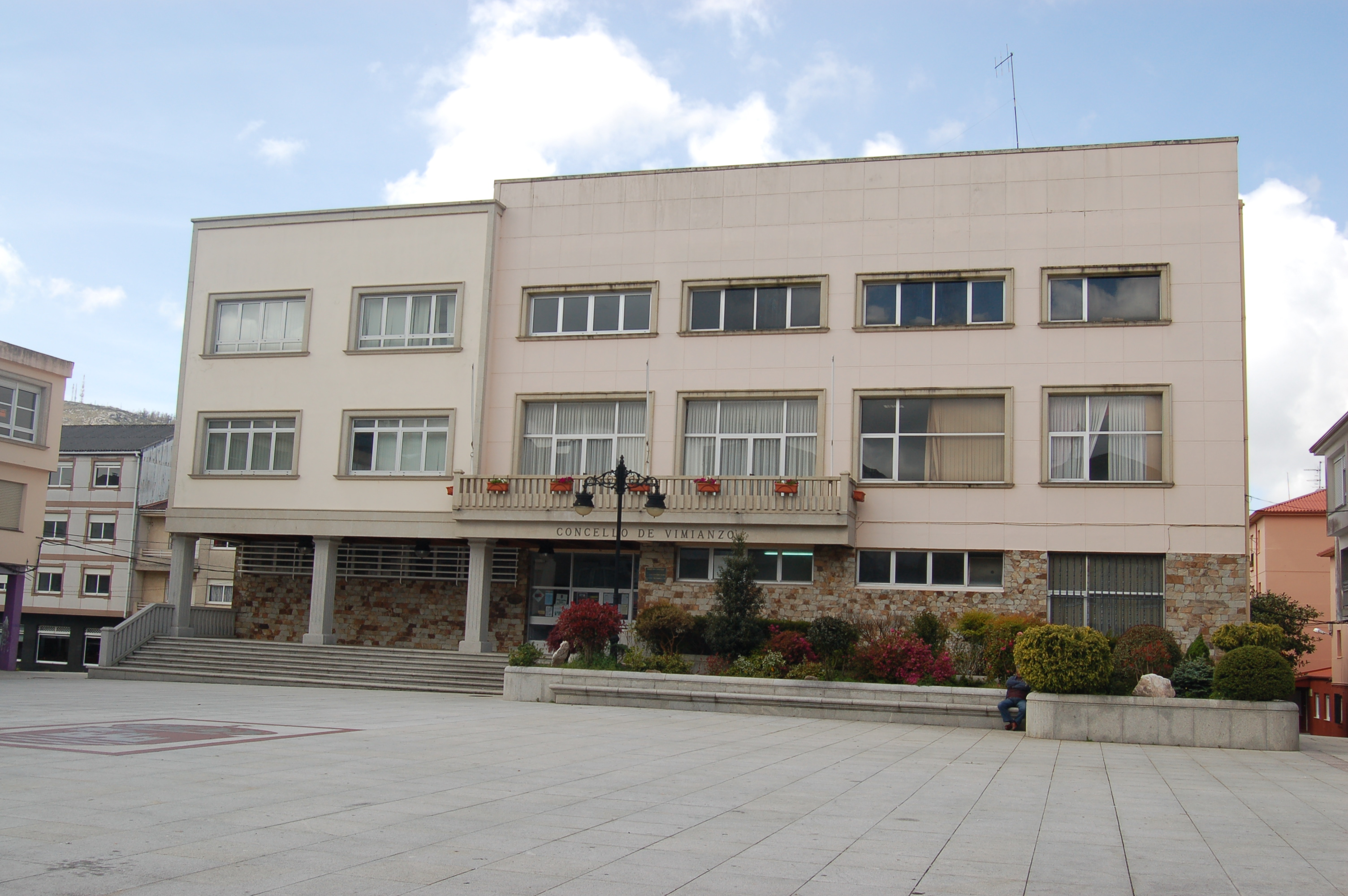
- Town hall

- Coat of arms

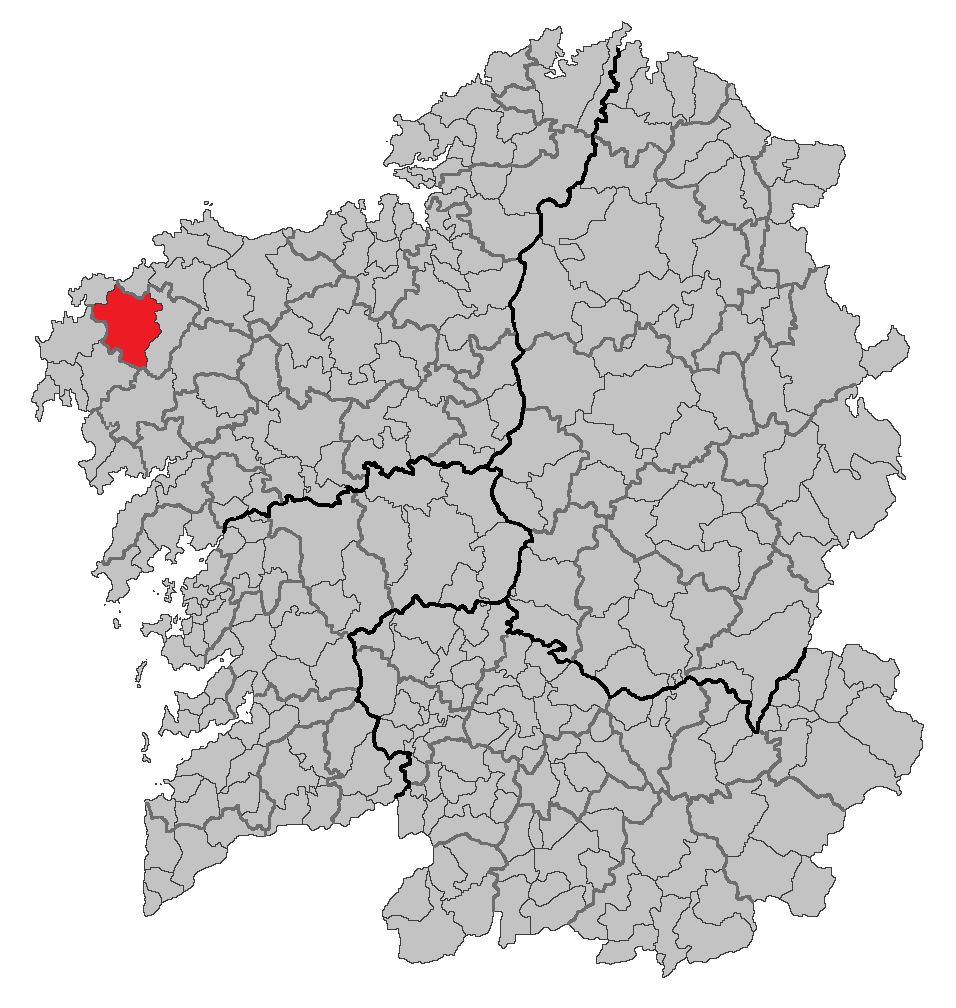
- Location of Vimianzo within Galicia

- Location Vimianzo (Spain)
- Coordinates: 43.11°N 9.034444°W
- Country: Spain
- Autonomous community: Galicia
- Province: A Coruña
- Comarca: Terra de Soneira
- Parroquias: 14

Government
  - Alcalde (Mayor): Mónica Rodríguez (PSdeG-PSOE)

Area
  - Total: 188.13 km^{2} (72.64 sq mi)

Population (2025-01-01)
  - Total: 6,768
  - Density: 35.98/km^{2} (93.18/sq mi)
- Time zone: UTC+1 (CET)
  - Summer (DST): UTC+2 (CEST)
- Website: www.vimianzo.es

Vimianzo is a municipality in the province of A Coruña in the autonomous community of Galicia, northwestern Spain. It belongs to the comarca of Terra de Soneira.

== Boundary ==
The city is bounded on the north by the municipalities of Camariñas, Laxe and the Atlantic Ocean on a small ledge. To the east it borders the municipality of Zas, south to the town Dumbría and a dam that separates the Fervenza Township Mazaricos, and west by the town of Muxía.

== Main sights ==
- Dolmen of Pedra da Arca
- Vimianzo castle

== Villages ==
- Señoráns

== See also ==
- List of municipalities in A Coruña
