= Place of refuge =

A place of refuge includes various places where people can seek refuge:

- An asylum (antiquity), in antiquity, a place (usually a temple) where people could seek refuge
- A sovereign offering the right of asylum
- A sanctuary, a place offering safety from persecution
- Place of refuge for ships, for ships in distress
- Puʻuhonua o Hōnaunau, a National Historical Park in Hawai'i
