= Cape Vilan =

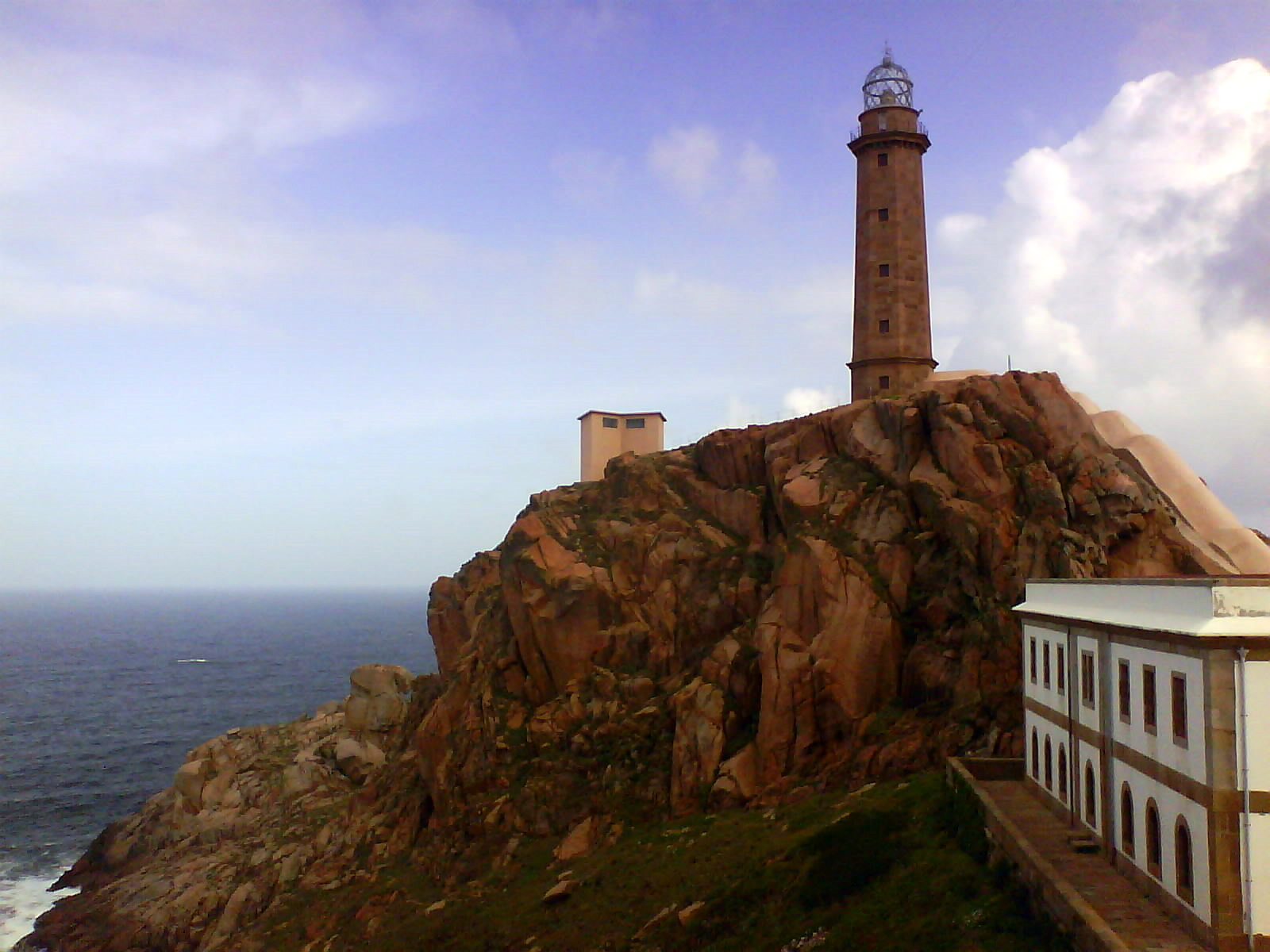
- Cape Vilan, northwest of Camariñas

- Location within Spain
- Coordinates: 43°09′38″N 9°12′42″W
- Country: Spain
- Autonomous community: Galicia
- Province: A Coruña
- Comarca: Terra de Soneira

Cape Vilan (Galician: Cabo Vilán) is a rock-bound peninsula on the west coast of Galicia, Spain, located in Costa da Morte ("Coast of Death"), specifically close the village of Camariñas. The place was declared of National Interest in 1933 and today is a Natural Monument. However, near the cape was installed a wind farm and a fish farm breeding turbot.

The Cape Vilan Lighthouse marks this dangerous section of the Costa da Morte. Erected at 125 meters altitude and attached to the old building of the lighthouse keepers, it has a powerful light that can reach 55 km. It is the oldest electric lighthouse in Spain.

In 1890, the English ship HMS Serpent, which sailed to the Sierra Leone, sank near the cape because of a storm, perishing 173 men that were buried in the English Cemetery (Cemiterio dos Ingleses), a short distance out Cape Vilan.

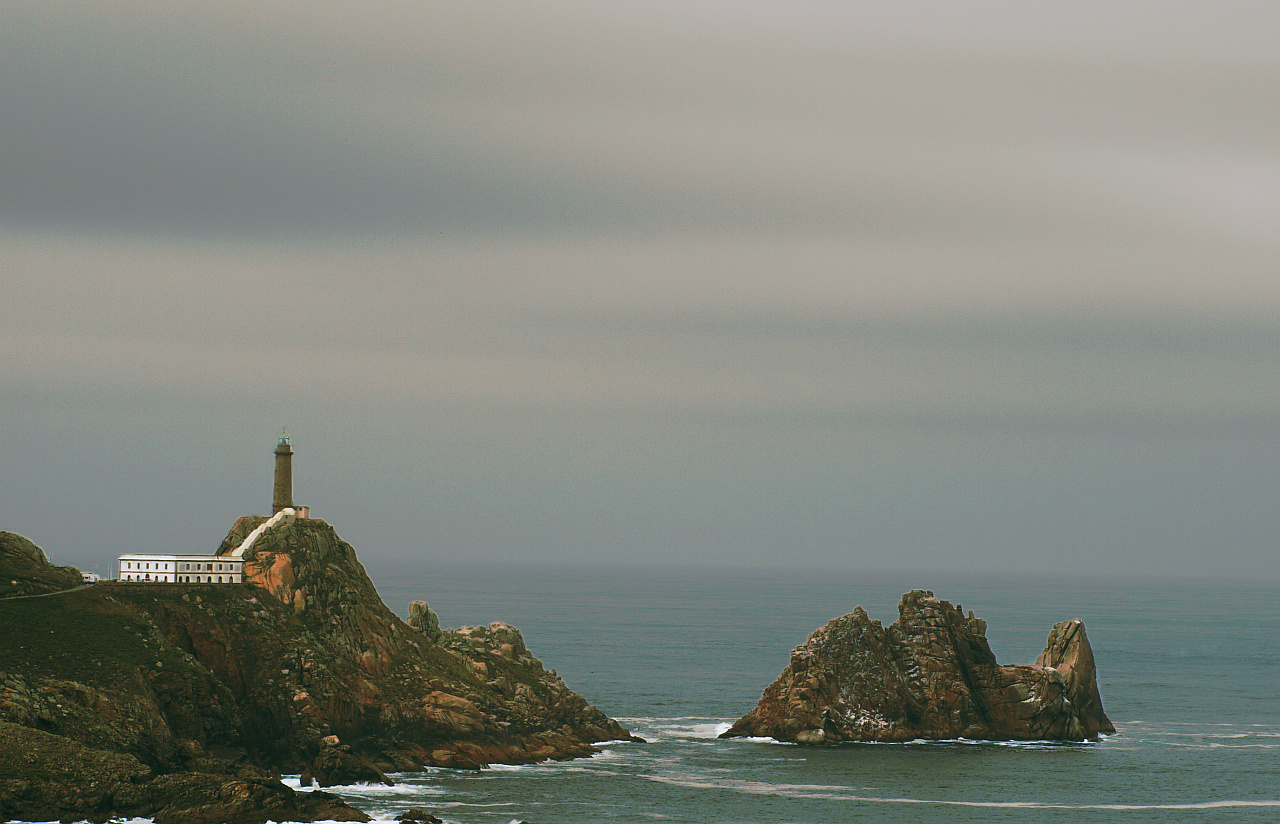
Cape Vilan and Vilán de Fóra islet

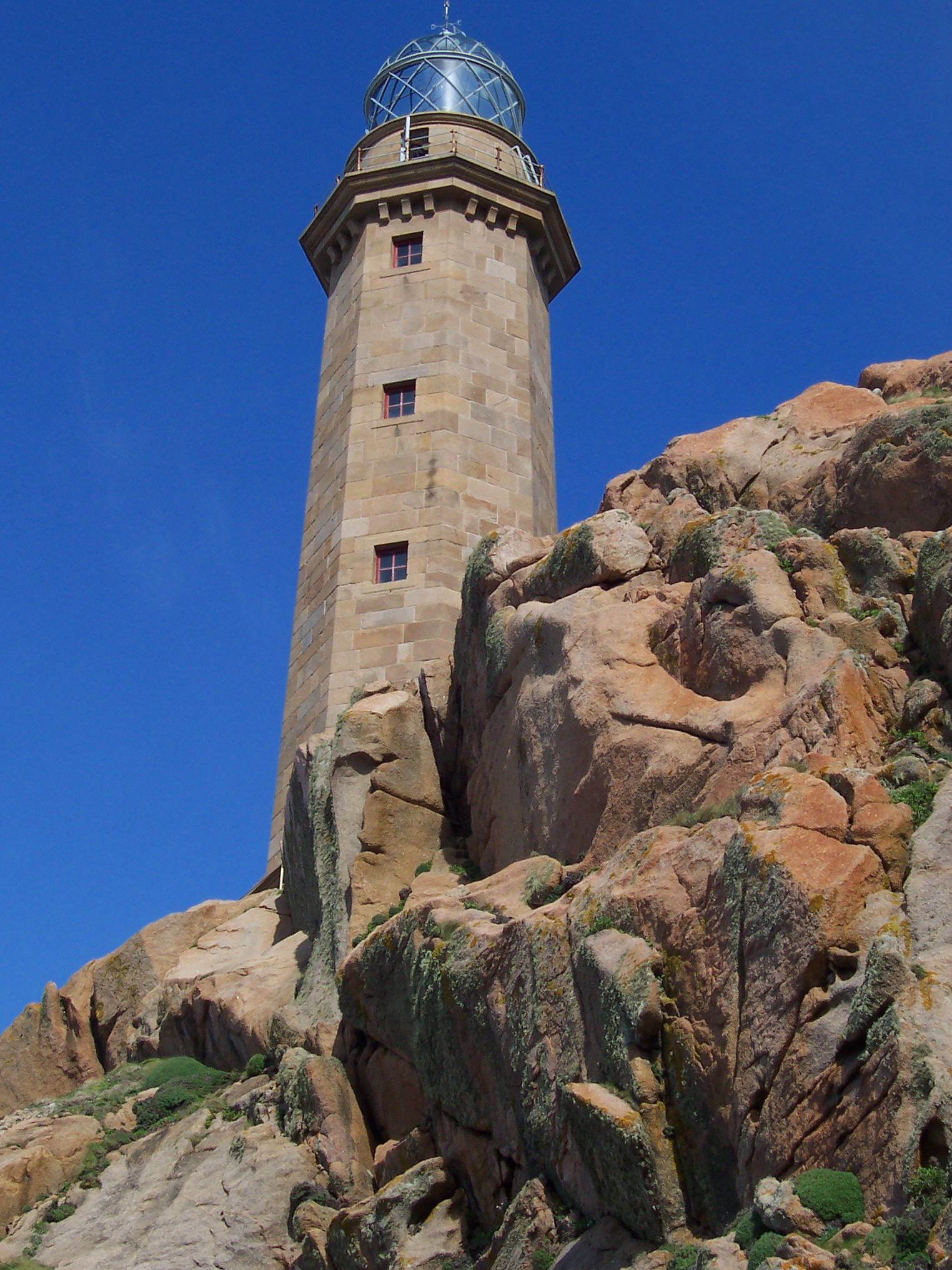
Lighthouse

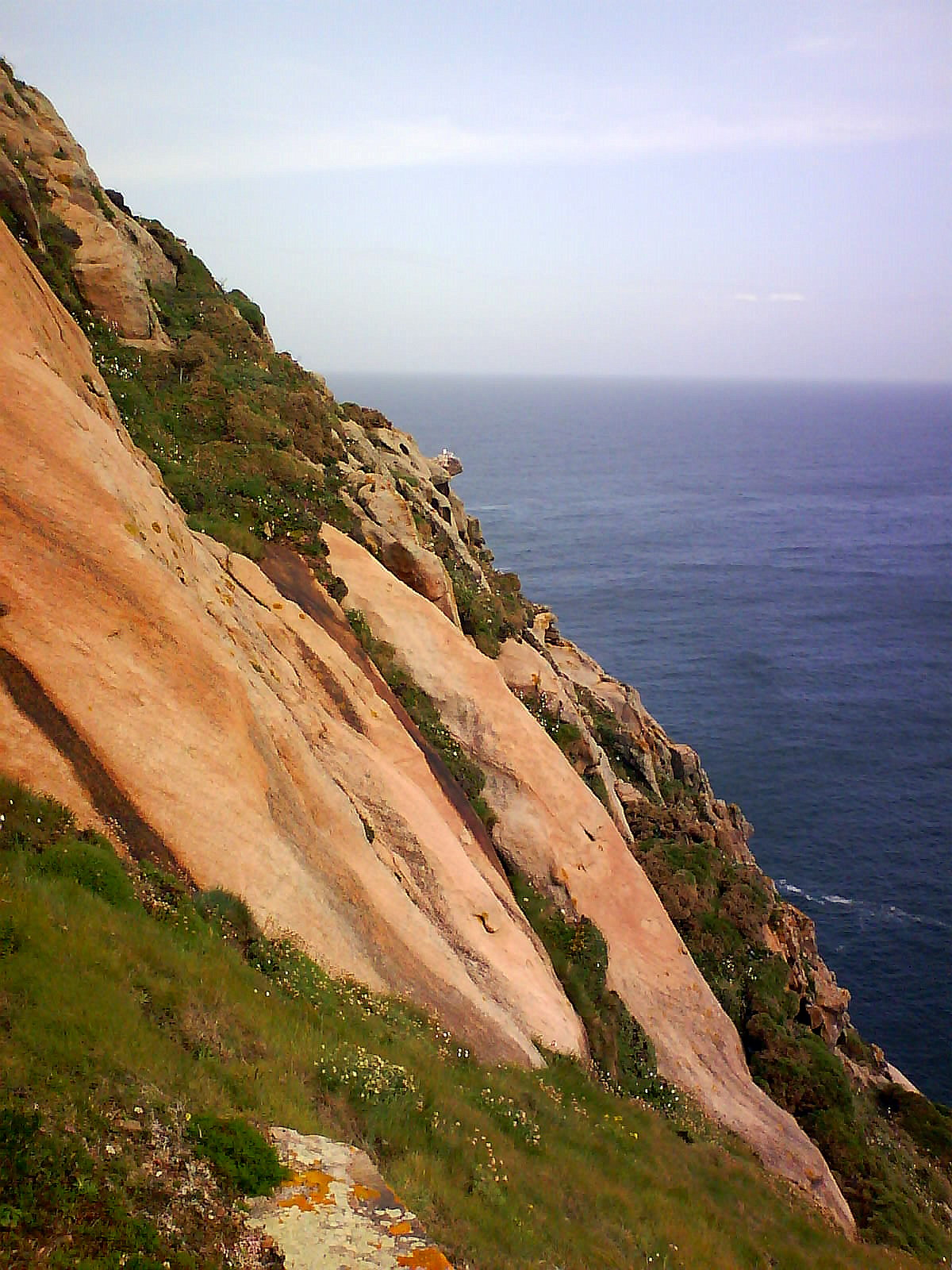
Cliffs

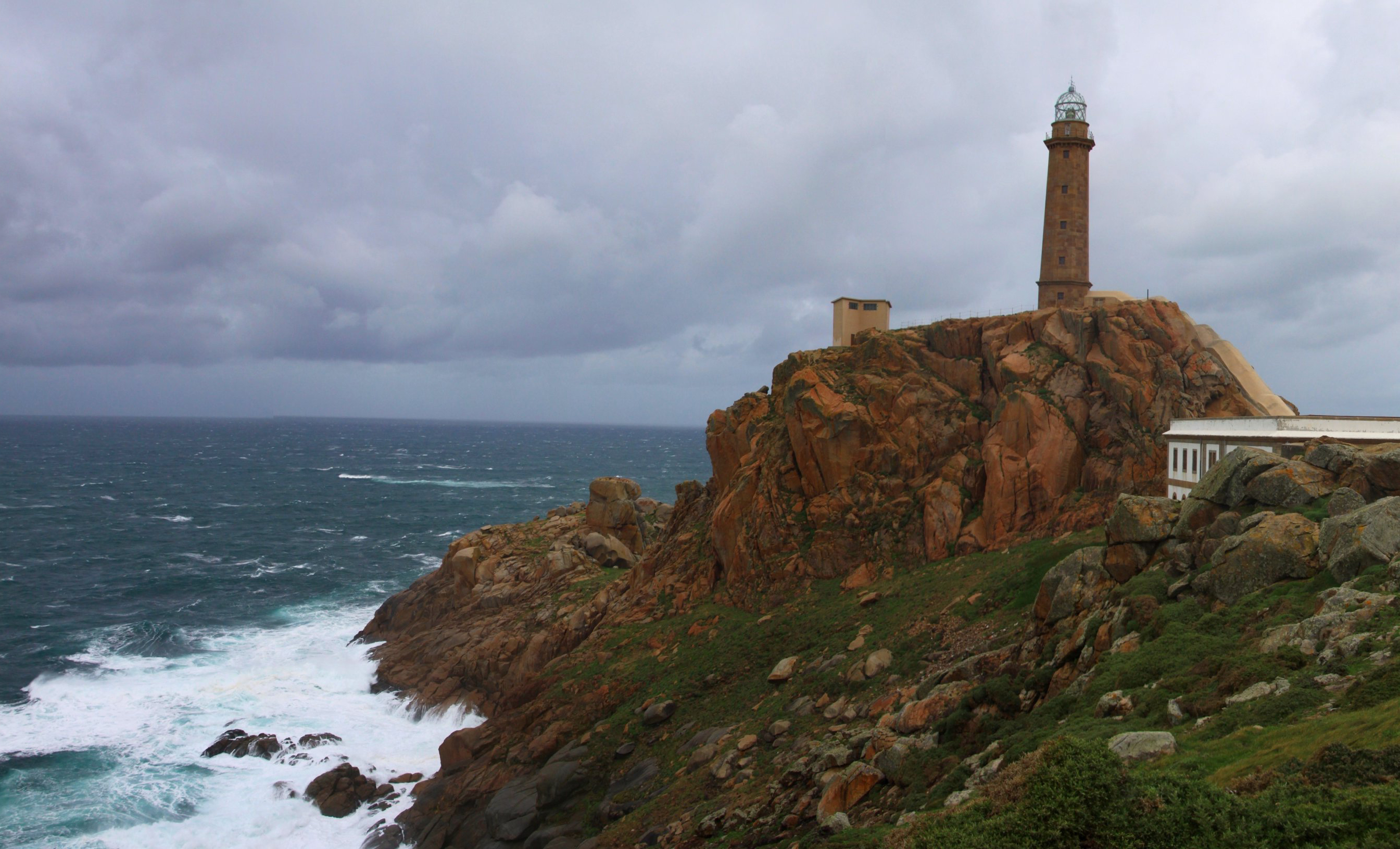
Overview of the cape
