= Prestige oil spill =

2002 environmental disaster off the coast of Galicia, Spain

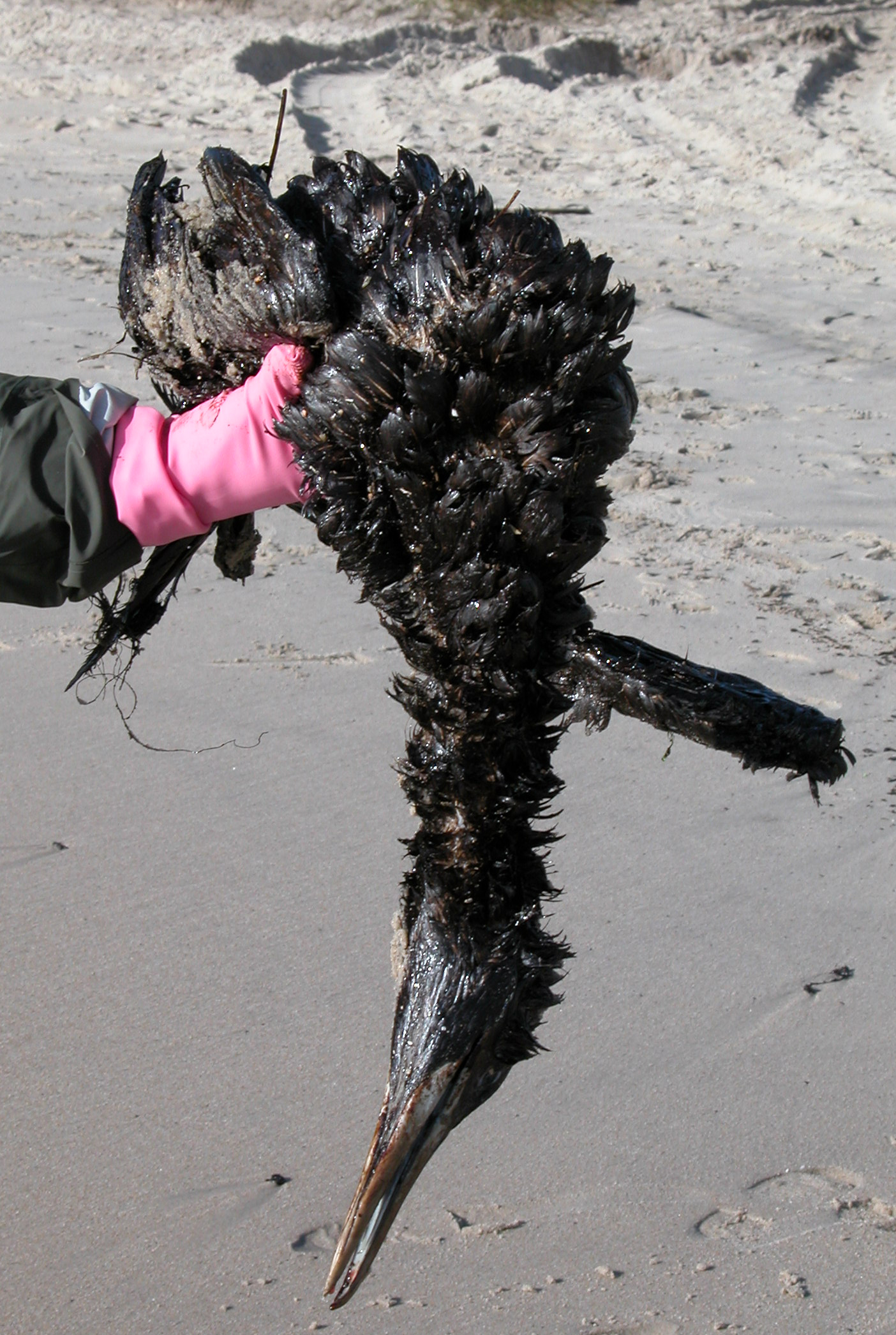
- A gannet killed by the spill.
- Interactive map of Prestige oil spill
- Location: Atlantic Ocean; 130 miles from the coast of Galicia, Spain
- Coordinates: 42°53′00″N 9°53′00″W
- Date: 13 November 2002; 24 years ago

Cause
- Cause: Hull breach
- Operator: Universe Maritime Ltd.

Spill characteristics
- Volume: 17.8×10^{6} US gal (420,000 bbl; 67,000 m^{3})(or a mass of 60,000 tonnes)
- Shoreline impacted: 800 mi (1,300 km)

The Prestige oil spill occurred off the coast of Galicia, Spain, in November 2002, caused by the sinking of the 26-year-old, structurally deficient oil tanker MV Prestige, carrying 77,000 tonnes of heavy fuel oil. During a storm, it burst a tank on 13 November, and French, Spanish, and Portuguese governments refused to allow the ship to dock. The vessel subsequently sank on 19 November, about 210 kilometres (130 mi) from the coast of Galicia. It is estimated that it spilled 60,000 tonnes or a volume of 67,000 m^{3} (17.8 million US gal) of heavy fuel oil.

The oil spill polluted 2300 kilometers (1429 miles) of coastline and more than one thousand beaches on the Spanish, French and Portuguese coast, as well as causing great harm to the local fishing industry. The spill is the largest environmental disaster in the history of both Spain and Portugal. The amount of oil spilled was more than the Exxon Valdez incident and the toxicity was considered higher, because of the higher water temperatures.

In 2008, the Southern District of New York dismissed a 2003 lawsuit by the Kingdom of Spain against the American Bureau of Shipping, the international classification society which had certified the Prestige as in compliance with rules and laws, because ABS was a "person" per the International Convention on Civil Liability for Oil Pollution Damage and exempt from direct liability for pollution damage. The 2012 trial of the Galicia regional High Court did not find the merchant shipping company, nor the insurer, the London P&I Club nor any Spanish government official, but only the captain of the ship guilty and gave him a nine-month suspended sentence for disobedience. In January 2016, the Spanish Supreme Court held the London P&I Club liable for damages up to the amount of its overall cover for the shipowner for pollution of $1 billion. In October 2023, the English High Court found the ruling incompatible to the arbitration terms of the insurance contract. That decision was upheld by the Court of Appeal and the United Kingdom Supreme Court.

== Events ==
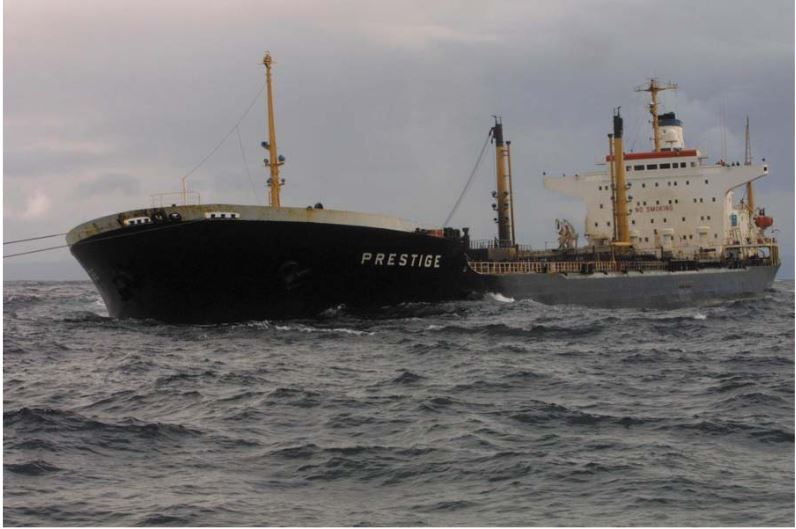
MV Prestige shortly before her sinking

The Prestige was a 26-year-old Greek-operated, single-hulled oil tanker, officially registered in the Bahamas, but with a Liberian-registered single-purpose corporation as the owner.

The ship had a deadweight tonnage, or carrying capacity, of approximately 81,000 tons, a measurement that put it at the small end of the Aframax class of tankers, smaller than most carriers of crude oil but larger than most carriers of refined products. It was classed by the American Bureau of Shipping and insured by the London P&I Club, a shipowners' mutual known as the London Club.

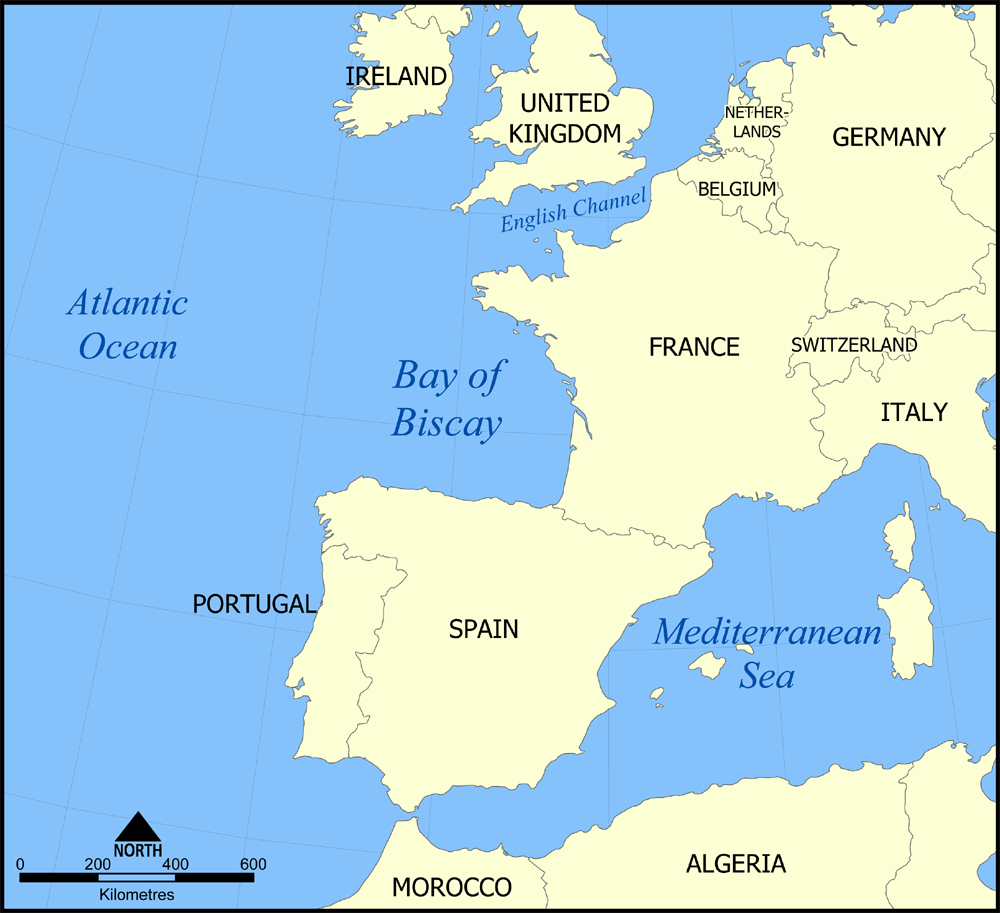
The French, Spanish and Portuguese governments refused to allow the Prestige to dock in their ports.

On 13 November 2002, the Prestige was carrying 77,000 tonnes of two different grades of heavy fuel oil, crude #4. It encountered a winter storm off Costa da Morte, the Coast of Death, in Galicia, northwestern Spain. The Greek captain, Apostolos Mangouras, reported a loud bang from the starboard side and as the ship began to take on water from high waves the engines shut down and he called for help from Spanish rescue workers. The Filipino crew was evacuated with rescue helicopters and the ship drifted within 6 kilometres (4 mi) of the Spanish coast, already leaking oil. A veteran captain, Serafín Díaz, was lowered onto the ship per the Spanish government's Industry Ministry, to navigate the ship off the Spanish coast northwest, and saw the gaping 15 metres (50 ft) hole on the starboard side. Mangouras argued the ship should be brought into port where the leaking oil might be confined but under the threat of the Spanish navy Mangouras relented. After pressure from the French government, the vessel was forced to change its course and head south into Portuguese waters in order to avoid endangering France's southern coast. Fearing for its own shore, the Portuguese authorities ordered its navy to intercept the ailing vessel and prevent it from approaching further. The decision to tow the damaged tanker offshore rather than escort to a sheltered anchorage has been described as a criminal act and the reason why such a large area was polluted.

With the French, Spanish, and Portuguese governments refusing to allow the ship to dock, and after several days of sailing and towing, it split in half on 19 November 2002. It sank only about 250 kilometres (160 mi) from the Spanish coast, releasing over 64,000 m^{3} (17 million US gal) of oil into the sea. An earlier oil slick had already reached the coast. The captain of the Prestige was taken into custody, accused of not cooperating with marine salvage crews and of harming the environment.

== Leakage and environmental contamination ==
The Prestige oil spill is Spain's worst ecological disaster. After the sinking, the wreck continued to leak approximately 125 tonnes of oil a day, polluting the seabed and contaminating the coastline, especially along the territory of Galicia. The environmental damage was most severe on the coast of Galicia. The affected area is an important ecological region, supporting coral reefs and a number of species of sharks and birds, and the fishing industry. The heavy coastal pollution forced the region's government to suspend offshore fishing for six months.

Initially, the government thought only 17,000 of the tanker's 77,000 tonnes of oil had been lost, and that the remaining 60,000 tonnes would freeze and not leak from the sunken tanker. In early 2003, it announced that half of the oil had been lost. As of August 2003, the figure had risen to about 63,000 tonnes, and more than eighty percent of the tanker's 77,000 tonnes of fuel oil have been spilled off Spain's northwest coast.

The environmental devastation caused is at least on a par, if not worse, than the Exxon Valdez. The amount of oil spilled is more than the Valdez and the toxicity is higher, because of the higher temperatures.

— Simon Walmsley, the World Wildlife Fund's senior policy officer for shipping.

In March 2006, new oil slicks were detected near the wreck of the Prestige, slicks which investigators found to match the type of oil the Prestige carried. A study released in December 2006 led by José Luis De Pablos, a physicist at Madrid's Center for Energetic and Environmental Research, concluded that 16,000 to 23,000 tonnes of oil remained in the wreck, as opposed to the 700 to 1300 tonnes claimed by the Spanish government; that bioremediation of the remaining oil failed; and that bacteria corroding the hull could soon produce a rupture and quickly release much of the remaining oil and create another catastrophic spill. The report urged the government to take "prompt" action.

Experts predicted marine life could suffer from the pollution for at least ten years due to the type of oil spill, which contained light fractions with polyaromatic hydrocarbons and could poison plankton, fish eggs and crustaceans with carcinogenic effects in fish and potentially humans as well.

== Cleanup ==
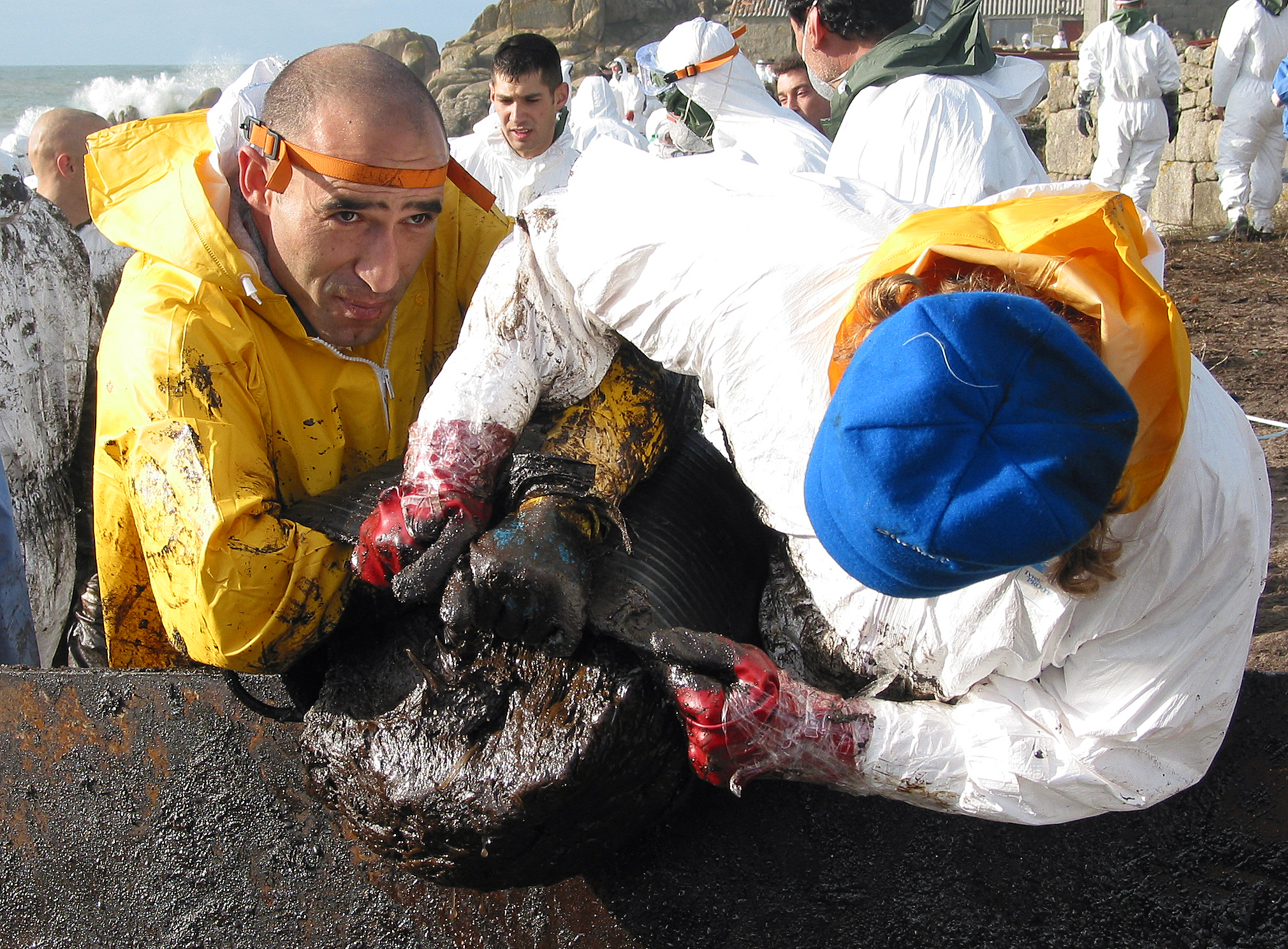
Volunteers cleaning the coastline in Galicia in the aftermath of the Prestige catastrophe, March 2003, from Historias del Chapapote (Stories of Tar)

In the subsequent months, thousands of volunteers joined the public company TRAGSA (the firm chosen by the regional government to deal with the cleanup) to help clean the affected coastline. The massive cleaning campaign was a success, recovering most portions of coastline from not only the effects of the oil spill but also the accumulated "regular" contamination. Galician activists founded the environmental movement Nunca Máis (Galician for "Never Again"), to denounce the passiveness of the conservative government regarding the disaster. A year after the spill, Galicia had more Blue Flags for its beaches (an award for those beaches with the highest standards in the world) than in the previous years.

In 2004, remotely operated vehicles (ROVs) like the one which originally explored the wreck of the RMS Titanic drilled small holes in the wreck and removed the remaining 13,000 m^{3} of cargo oil from the wreck, at 4000 meters below the sea surface. The ROVs also sealed cracks in the tanker's hull, and slowed the leakage to a trickle of 20 litres a day. In total, 20 million US gallons (76,000 m^{3}) of oil were spilled. The oil was then pumped into large aluminium shuttles, specially manufactured for this salvage operation. The filled shuttles were then floated to the surface. The original plan to fill large bags with the oil proved to be too problematic and slow. After the oil removal was completed, a slurry rich in microbiologic agents was pumped into the hold to speed up the breakdown of any remaining oil. The total estimated cost of the operation was over €100 million.

== Aftermath ==
Nunca Máis Flag

=== Investigation ===
The massive environmental and financial costs of the spill resulted in an inquiry into how a structurally deficient ship was able to travel out to sea. The Prestige had set sail from St. Petersburg, Russia, without being properly inspected. It traveled to the Atlantic via the shallow and vulnerable Baltic Sea. A previous captain in St. Petersburg, Esfraitos Kostazos, who complained to the owners about multiple structural deficiencies within the ship, was rebuffed and resigned in protest. Rather than repair the defects, the owners replaced him with Mangouras.

The ownership of the Prestige was unclear, making it difficult to determine exactly who was responsible for the oil spill and exposing the difficulties in regulations posed by flags of convenience.

Spanish investigators found that the failure in the hull of the Prestige had been predicted already: her two sister ships, Alexandros and Centaur, had been submitted to extensive inspections under the "Safe Hull" program in 1996. The organization in charge of the inspections, the American Bureau of Shipping, found that both Alexandros and Centaur were in terminal decline. Due to metal fatigue in their hulls, modeling predicted that both ships would fail between frames 61 and 71 within five years. Alexandros, Centaur and a third sister-ship, Apanemo, were scrapped between 1999 and 2002. Little more than five years after the inspection, Prestige's hull failed between frames 61 and 71.

The Spanish government was criticized for its decision to tow the ailing wreck out to sea— where it split in two—rather than into a port. The refusal to allow the ship to take refuge in a sheltered port has been called a major contributing factor to the scale of the disaster. The World Wildlife Fund's senior policy officer for shipping Simon Walmsley believed most of the blame lay with the classification society. "It was reported as being substandard at one of the ports it visited before Spain. The whole inspection regime needs to be revamped and double-hulled tankers used instead," he said. According to the ABS classification society, the fact that it took 6 days for the ship break-up and sink in heavy sea is "proof positive that the vessel was not in a substandard condition". The US and most other countries were planning to phase out single-hulled tankers by 2012.

=== Plan Galicia ===
Plan Galicia was a set of economic measures adopted by the Spanish Council of Ministers on 23 January 2003, in an attempt to mitigate the consequences of the Prestige disaster. Plan Galicia was presented as complementary to the one approved days before by the Xunta de Galicia.

=== Cleanup cost ===
A report by the Galicia-based Barrie de la Maza economic institute in 2003 criticised the Spanish government's handling of the catastrophe. It estimated the cost of the clean-up to the Galician coast alone at €2.5 billion.

The 2013 court ruling put the cost of the disaster at 368 million euros ($494 million) to the Spanish state, 145 million euros to the Spanish region of Galicia and 68 million euros to France. The clean-up of the Exxon Valdez cost US$3 billion (almost €2.2 billion).

Since the disaster, oil tankers similar to the Prestige have been directed away from the French and Spanish coastlines. The European Commissioner for Transport at the time, Spaniard Loyola de Palacio, pushed for the ban of single-hulled tankers.

=== Legal consequences ===
Captain Mangouras sought refuge for his seriously damaged vessel in a Spanish port. Although the obligation of Spanish shipping authorities to provide a port of refuge has deep historic roots, in this case the authorities decided to apply the exemptions of international maritime law for situations where the ship would cause environmental or other damage to the port. The Captain had been ordered to restart the engines and steam offshore, but refused to comply. A replacement captain, Serafin Diaz, was lowered onto the ship per the Spanish government's Industry Ministry, to navigate the ship off the Spanish coast northwest. Magouras was arrested and faced criminal charges. Bringing the ship into port and booming around her to contain the leaking oil would have been less harmful than sending her back to sea and almost inevitable sinking.

In May 2003, the Kingdom of Spain brought a civil suit in the Southern District of New York against the American Bureau of Shipping (ABS), the Houston-based international classification society which had certified the "Prestige" as "in class" for its final voyage. The "in class" status states that the vessel is in compliance with all applicable rules and laws, not that it is safe, fit for purpose, or seaworthy. For the world maritime industry, a key issue raised by the incident was whether classification societies could be held responsible for the consequences. International maritime trade publications including TradeWinds, Fairplay and Lloyd's List regularly presented the dispute as a possibly precedent-setting one which could prove fateful for international classification societies, whose assets are dwarfed by the scale of claims to which they could become subject. On 2 January 2007, the docket in that lawsuit (SDNY 03-cv-03573) was dismissed. The presiding judge ruled that ABS is a "person" as defined by the International Convention on Civil Liability for Oil Pollution Damage (CLC) and, as such, is exempt from direct liability for pollution damage. Additionally, the Judge ruled that, since the United States was not a signatory to the International CLC, the US courts lack the necessary jurisdiction to adjudicate the case. Spain's original damage claim against ABS was some $700 million.

The Galicia regional High Court set the Prestige oil spill trial date for 16 October 2012, against officers, the insurer London Club, International Fund for Compensation for Oil Pollution Damage, the ship's owner, Liberia-based Mare Shipping Inc with its director general. The harbor master of A Coruña at the time, Ángel del Real, and a Galician government delegate, Arsenio Fernández de Mesa, had also been charged with "aggravating the disaster by ignoring technical advice". the hearing began on 16 June 2012 and expected to adjourn in November, the tenth anniversary of the disaster. The trial was held in a specially constructed courtroom in A Coruña's exhibition complex. It considered evidence from 133 witnesses and 98 experts. Plaintiffs asked the Greek captain to be sentenced up to 12 years and demanded more than 4 billion euros ($5.0 billion) in damages overall.

The insurer refused to participate in the Spanish proceedings on the basis that the parties should submit arbitration in England, as per the insurance contract. On 16 January 2012, the insurer commenced arbitration in London and on 13 February 2013 (Spain) and 3 July 2013 (France) the Arbitration tribunal upheld the insurers' claims for arbitration in England. This was subsequently converted into a judgement by the High Court of England and Wales.

In November 2013, the three Galicia High Court judges concluded, it was impossible to establish criminal responsibility, and captain Apostolos Mangouras, chief engineer Nikolaos Argyropoulos and the former head of Spain's Merchant Navy, Jose Luis Lopez, were found not guilty of crimes against the environment. The captain was however accused of disobeying government authorities who wanted the tanker as far from the coast as possible. According to the court, that decision was correct and Mangouras, 78 at the time, was found guilty of disobedience and given a nine-month suspended sentence. The Spanish government decided to launch an appeal to the ruling against the exemption from civil liability of the captain.

On 26 January 2016, Spain's Supreme Court convicted Mangouras of recklessness resulting in catastrophic environmental damage, and sentenced him to two years in prison. The criminal conviction against the captain allows far higher compensation claims against the insurers. On 15 November 2017, London Club was ordered to pay a $1 billion fine over the oil spill. The overall damages awarded by the court in A Coruña in 2017 was just over €1.5bn, a figure confirmed by the Spanish Supreme Court in December 2018. In October 2023, the English High Court declined to enforce the ruling, according to established precedent that the arbitration must happen in English courts in whole.

=== Legacy ===
In 2003, the sculpture A Ferida (The Wound) by Alberto Bañuelos was erected as a monument to the volunteers who cleaned the Galician beaches of tar and symbolizing the wound to the sea after the massive oil spill. At 400 tons, this is the largest sculpture in Spain.

== See also ==
- Flag of convenience
- List of oil spills worldwide
- Manfred Gnädinger, human victim of spill
- Manuel Rivas, Galician writer
