= Manfred Gnädinger =

German sculptor

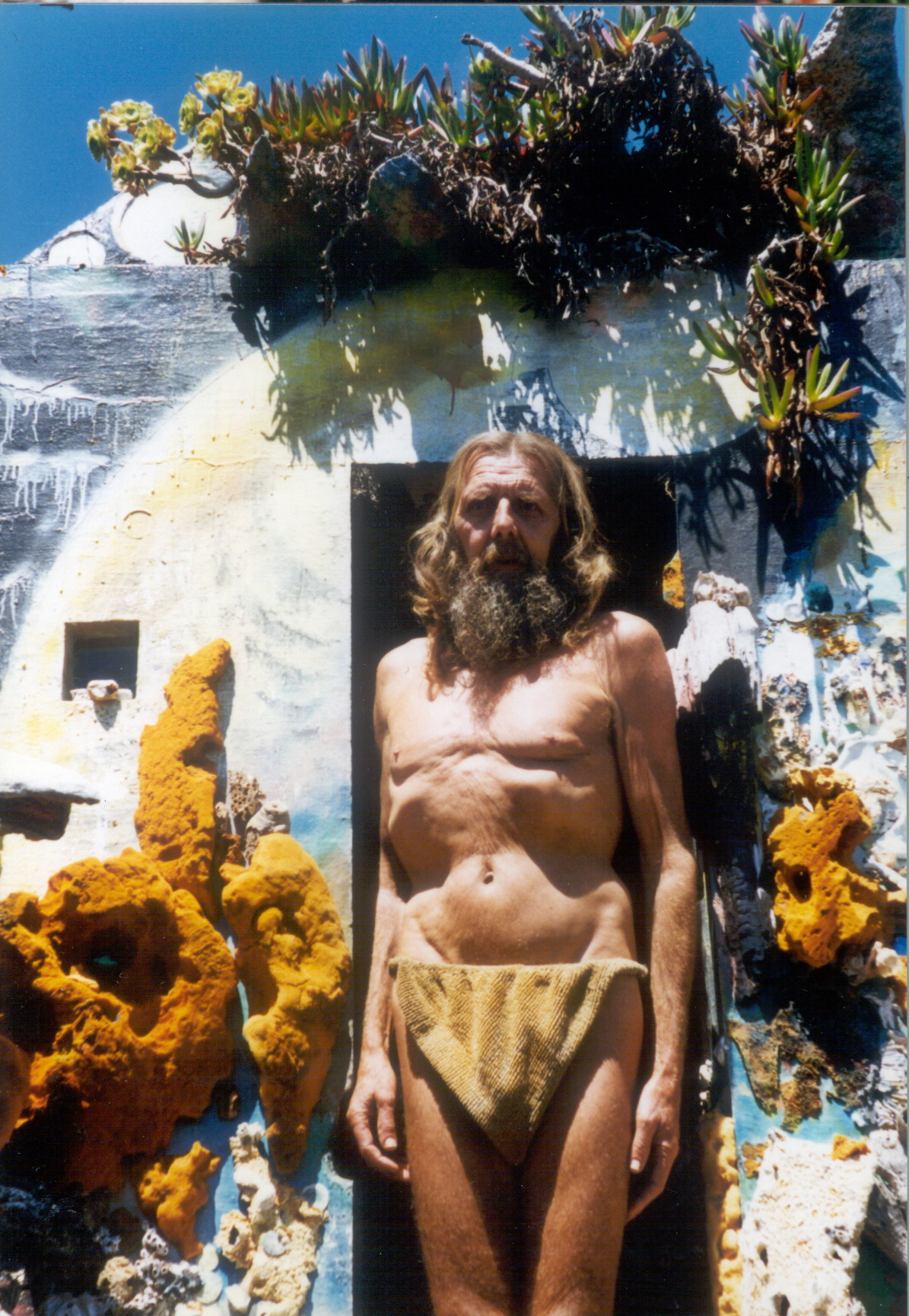
Man in July 1998

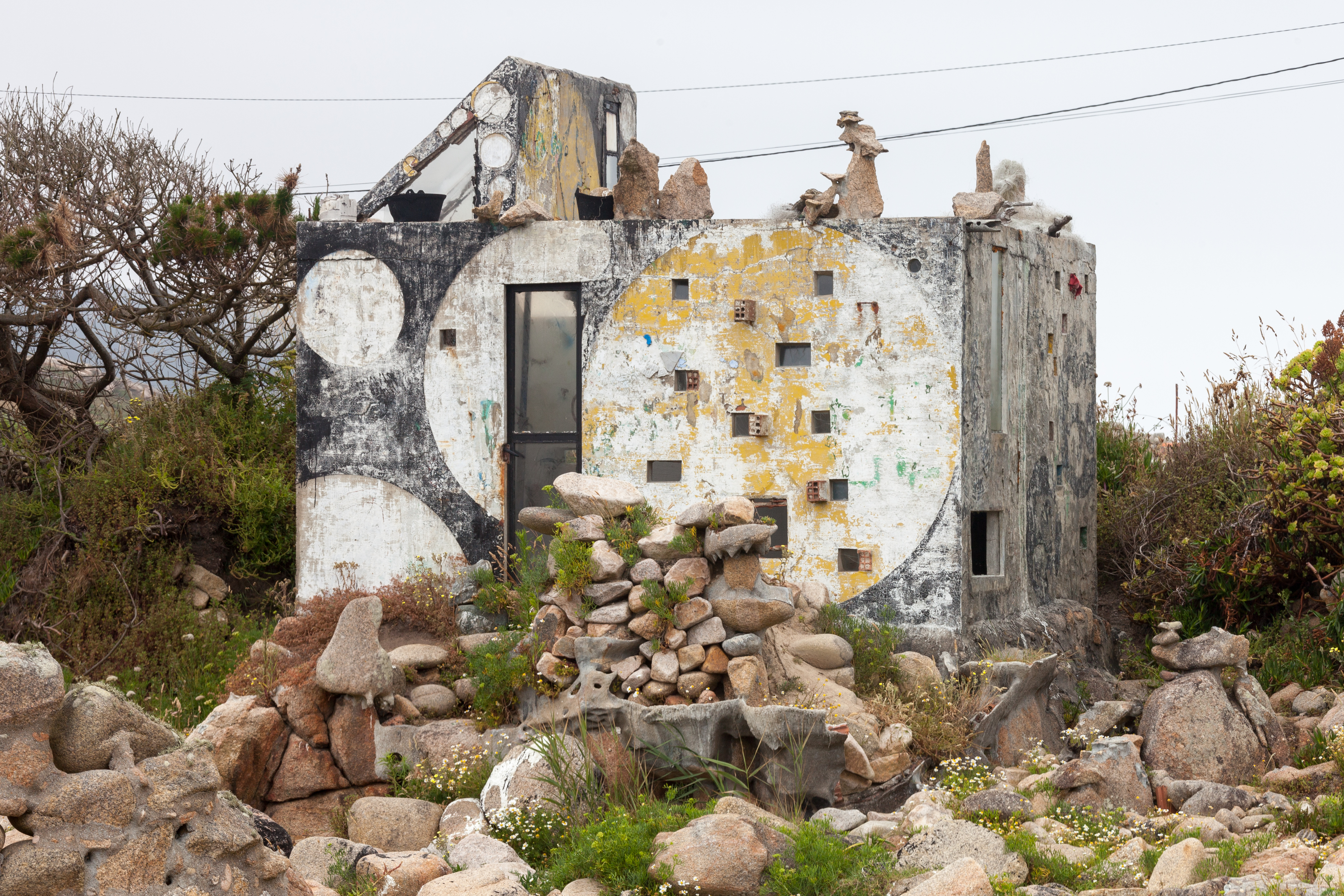
House of Manfred Gnädinger in Camelle, Galicia.

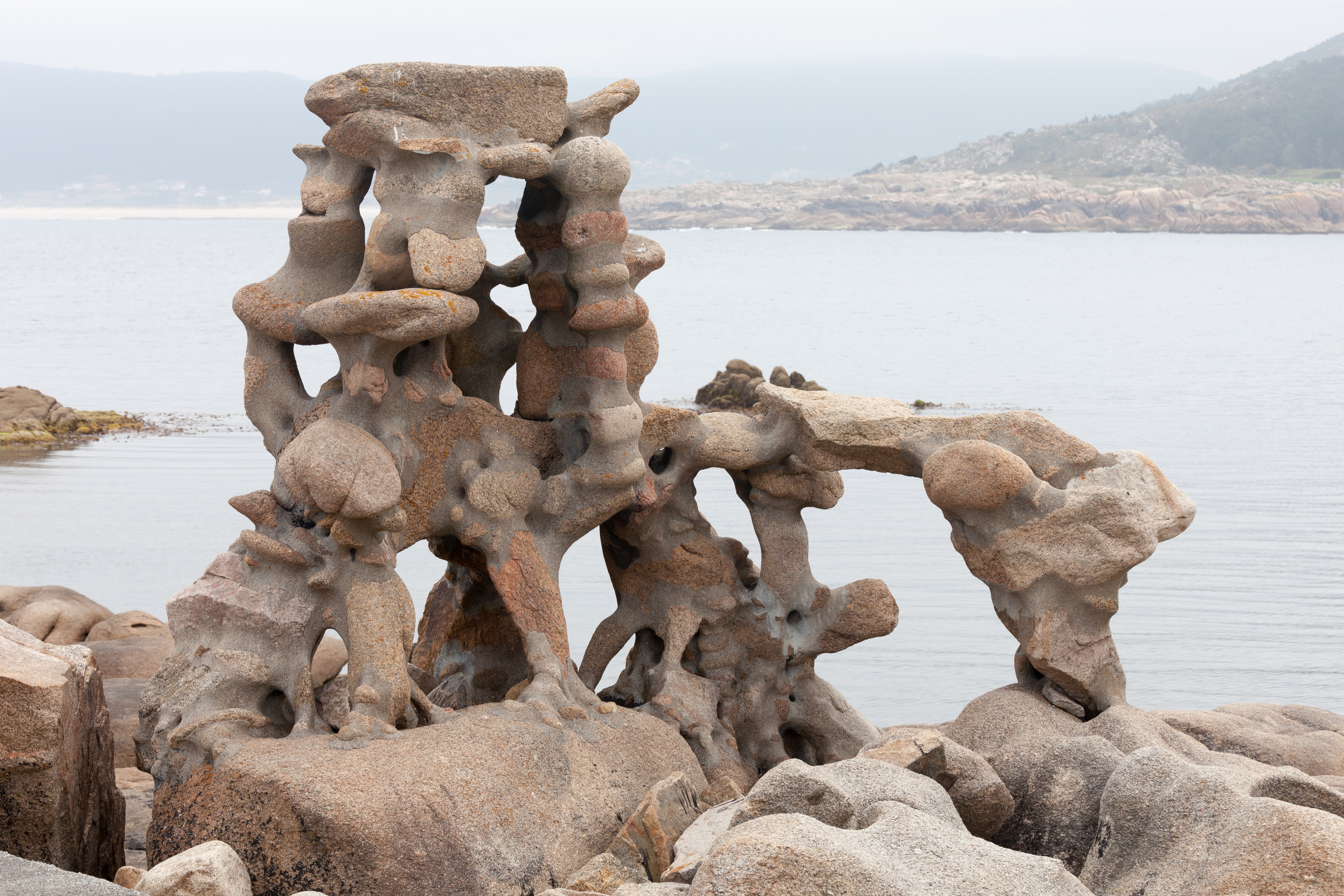
Sculpture by Man

Manfred Gnädinger (1936 in Boehringen, Germany – 28 December 2002, in Camelle, Spain) a.k.a. Man or O Alemán was a German hermit and sculptor who lived in the village of Camelle, on the Costa da Morte, in Galicia (Spain). He spent much of his time building sculptures on the beach and tending to his small garden. In November 2002, when the oil spill of the Prestige destroyed his sculptures and the ecosystem of the area he lived in, news reports stated that locals believed that Gnädinger let himself die of melancholy and sadness. He thus became a symbol of the destruction caused by the oil spill.

== Hermit and sculptor ==
In 1962, Manfred Gnädinger arrived in the small village of Camelle on the Costa da Morte, in Galicia (Spain), from Boehringen at Lake Constance in southern Germany. His whereabouts before this period are unknown. He was described as having been well-dressed and educated when he arrived. It is said that he went mad after falling in love with the teacher of the village and being rejected. A few years later, after studying ecological issues, he built himself a small hut on the beach of the village next to the Atlantic Ocean. He spent the next thirty years in this place, where he quickly became an object of curiosity for the village. Inhabitants referred to him in Galician as O Alemán (the German), then just "Man", a name he eagerly accepted for its symbolism. Tall, with a long beard, and wearing only a loincloth regardless the weather, he would swim out in the ocean, even after he was fifty years old. He had no electricity or running water in his hut, and was a strict vegetarian, eating only from the small organic garden he had created.

Man created colourful sculptures out of stones, driftwood, animal remains and other elements washed up by the sea. Some of these have been compared to Antoni Gaudi's work. Tourists would come to visit the open-air Museum of the German he had created where his sculptures were integrated in the natural landscape. Man's only source of revenue was a small fee (1€ as of 2002) he would ask of everyone visiting the Museum of the German. Man would also ask visitors to do drawings for him in small notebooks. More than 1000 of these notebooks were found after his death with around 200,000 drawings.

== The Prestige ==
On 13 November 2002, the oil tanker Prestige developed a huge leak in one of its tanks during a storm off the coast of Galicia. After four days, it split in half and sank into the Atlantic Ocean. Man's sculptures were heavily affected by the oil spill, with oil from the spill washing up on the beach where he lived. Most of his sculptures were irrecoverable, and oil reached his house.

A month later, he was found dead in his hut. Man had circulatory and respiratory problems beforehand, but it became local legend that he died of melancholy and sadness at the sight of the destruction of his life's work by the spill. The Camelle authorities organized and paid for his funeral, which hundreds of locals attended.

Thousands of birds and fish also died in the aftermath of the oil spill. Man's museum, which he bequeathed to the Ministry of Education and Cultural Affairs, can still be visited in Camelle. The museum has stayed open during severe weather in November 2010 and February 2014. The museum was restored in December 2017.

On the 10th anniversary of his death, Manfred Gnädinger was exhumed and cremated, as per his last will. A little more than 5 years later on January 27, 2018, he was interred in his museum.

== Bibliography ==
- A pegada de Man, text and photos by Xoán Abeleira, Xerais, Vigo (Galicia), 2006. This is the first book published of Manfred Gnädinger.
- Cequera, Bernardo: Manfred, the German of Camelle. Film Documentary 60 min. (2008)
- Saunders, Tracy and Gnädinger, Clemens: They Think You Are Jesus The Magical Madness of Man of Camelle, Priscillian Press, 2018
