= Noord Nederlandsche P&I Club =

Dutch P&I marine insurer

NNPC Marine Insurance
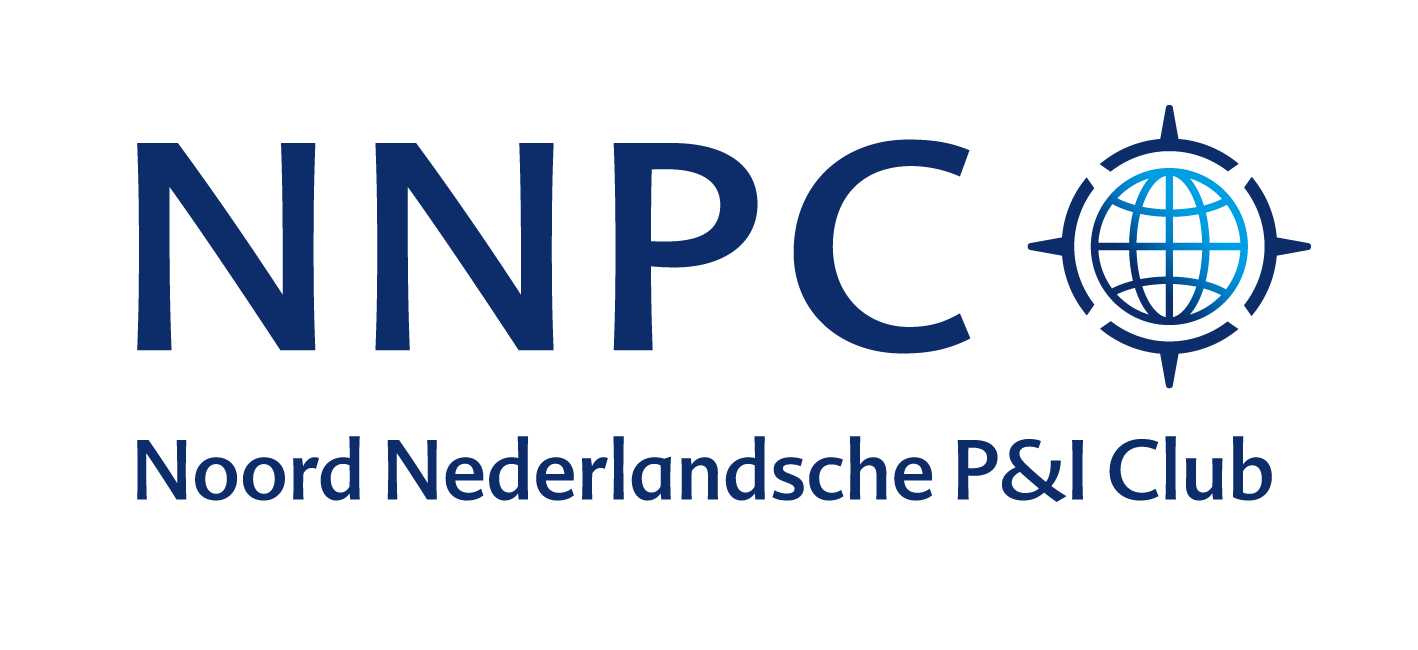

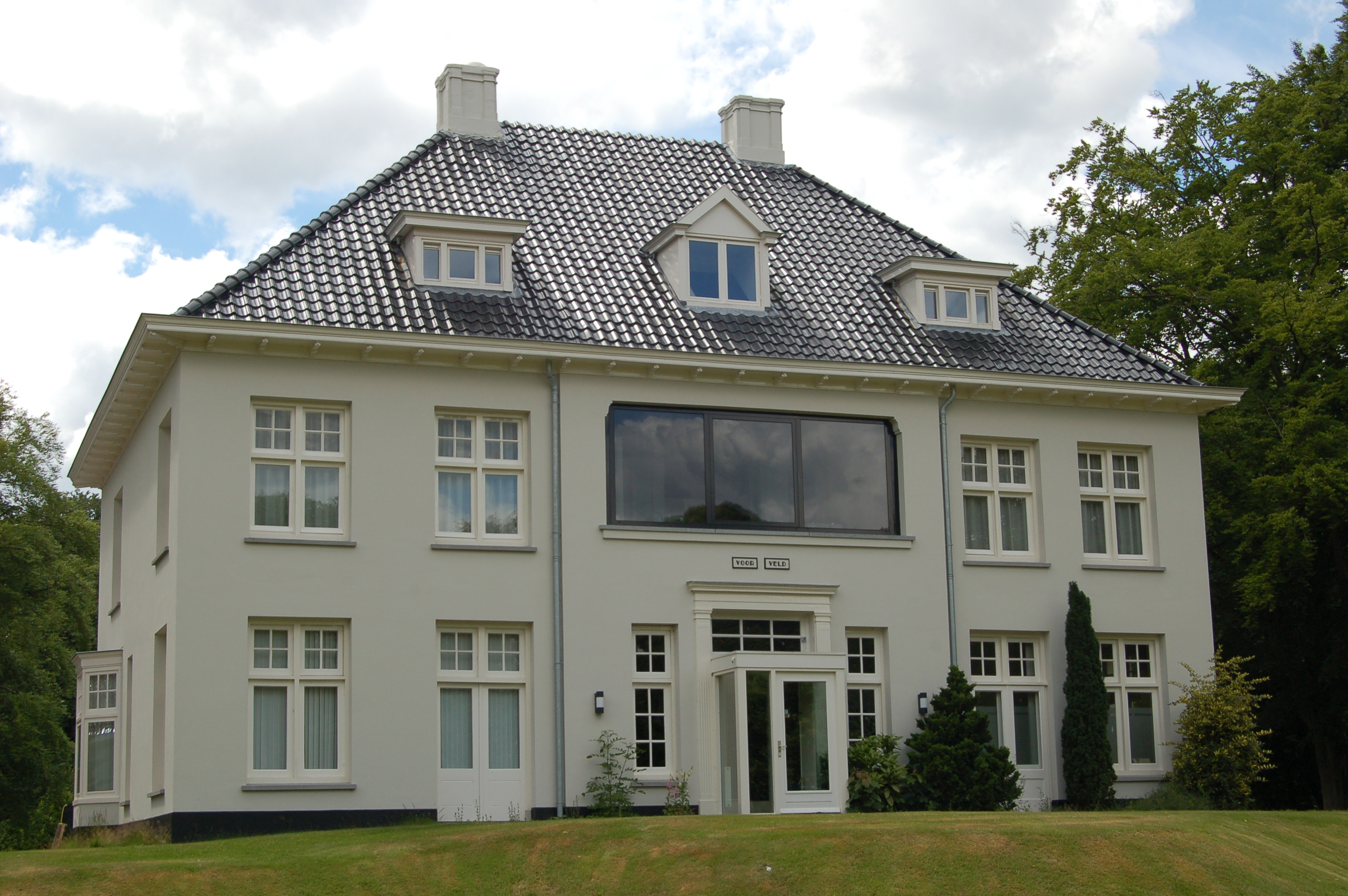
- Industry: Marine insurance
- Founded: 1937; 89 years ago
- Headquarters: Rijksstraatweg 361, 9752 CH Haren (Groningen), Netherlands
- Products: Marine protection and indemnity insurance
- Number of employees: 40
- Website: nnpc-marine.com

NNPC Marine Insurance (NNPC being an acronym for Noord Nederlandsche P&I Club) is a Dutch mutual ship insurance company and the only Dutch P&I club. It is a grandfathered member of the IG (International Group of P&I Clubs), which collectively insures over 90% of the world's tonnage. NNPC is primarily focused on the Benelux and German markets.

== History ==
=== Founding ===
NNPC Marine Insurance was founded on 18 January 1937 under the name "Noord Nederlandsche Protectie Club", with the purpose of insuring Dutch shipowners and captains against liability risks. The aim of founders Willem Schuitema, Jacob Kunst and Ebbe Hijlkema was to attract coastal shipowners operating in the vicinity of Groningen, who at that time were insured by English P&I clubs.

=== Second World War (1940–1945) ===
The breakout of the Second World War had repercussions for the insurer. Hostilities in the Baltic Sea area were a concern, as it was an important destination for many members and led to the cancellation of several charterparty agreements. During the occupation of the Netherlands, part of the coaster fleet was confiscated by the Germans, although a number of vessels managed to escape to England. About forty coasters which had fled to England took part in Allied operations during the war, including the rescue operation in Dunkirk and the landing in Normandy. During the first years of the occupation, NNPC Marine Insurance made attempts to address the matter of the seized ships. As the war continued, activity all but ceased.

=== Post-War Reconstruction (1945–1960) ===
The annual report from 1946 shows NNPC Marine Insurance had 120 members by the end of the year, which exceeded the number of members from before the war period. By 1958, NNPC Marine Insurance had grown to 500 members, with the club handling 573 claims per year on its members' behalf.

=== Downward trend and modernization (1960–2000) ===
The sixties were a turning point for the coastal and small shipping sector, notably due to the international trend of increased scale and specialization. In 1960, the Dutch fleet of coasters consisted of 930 ships, 500 of which were registered in the province of Groningen. In 1970, these numbers had fallen to 685 and 336 respectively. This downward trend would continue for another twenty years, until new government regulations created conditions for investment and modernization.

=== Growth and cooperation (2000-present) ===
In 2007, NNPC Marine Insurance fully aligned its insurance conditions with the International Group Agreement (IGA), one of the pillars of the IG. The biggest change was replacing the system of A and B classes of insurance with the IGA Class I for all P&I cases and Class II for FD&D (Freight, Demurrage & Defence).

Since 2008, NNPC Marine Insurance has taken out reinsurance with Steamship Mutual, Skuld, North of England and Standard). From February 2024 onwards, after the merger of North of England and Standard P&I, all reinsurances are placed with NorthStandard P&I.

NNPC Marine Insurance has since 2013 provided P&I cover for the Dutch inland shipping sector.

In 2016, NNPC Marine Insurance introduced a fixed insurance option for non-mutual clients.

NNPC Marine Insurance launched a subsidiary on 20 February 2021 called NNPC Correspondents BV, located in Rotterdam.

On 1 July 2025, the insurer transferred its activities to a new management structure and rebranded as NNPC Marine Insurance.

== Financial results ==
- Gross premium income in 2023: 17.1 million euros (source: annual report 2023)
- NNPC Marine Insurance has equity of 12.2 million euros (source: annual report 2023)
- The solvency ratio at the end of 2023 was 242%

NNPC Marine Insurance insures approximately 350 coastal vessels. Around 5,100 ships are insured for charterers’ liability with a total gross tonnage of 60 million.

== Partners and network ==
NNPC Marine Insurance employs a worldwide network of correspondents, lawyers and damage experts to assist its members. The club works with partners such as NorthStandard and Insure Marine Underwriting (IMU).

== Trivia ==
- The company slogan is "Worldwide. Always Around."
- NNPC Marine Insurance is the main sponsor of the annual Maritime Awards Gala, where awards are given to innovative companies in the Dutch shipping industry.
- In 2019, NNPC Marine Insurance sponsored the International Maritime Law Arbitration Moot, held by Erasmus University Rotterdam. During this event, law students took part in a moot maritime tribunal.
