= Ship in Distress =

Ship in Distress may refer to:

- Ship in Distress (1925 film), a German silent drama film
- Ship in Distress (1929 film), a German silent drama film

== See also ==
- Place of refuge for ships
