= Plan Galicia =

Plan Galicia was an economic recovery plan of the Spanish government that took place in Galicia after the Prestige oil spill. It was adopted by the Spanish Council of Ministers on January 23, 2003, in an attempt to mitigate the consequences of the Prestige disaster. Plan Galicia was presented as complementary to the one approved days before by the Xunta de Galicia.

The budgeted amount, 12,459 million euros, represented almost twice the annual budget of the Xunta de Galicia (also twice the state investment in Expo'92 in Seville and ten times more than the Barcelona Olympics).

The Galicia Plan was presented as complementary to the one approved days before by the Xunta, for a value of 1,663 million euros.

== Objectives of the Galicia Plan ==
In order to recover the Galician economy after the heavy blow that the oil spill caused both in the economic sectors directly related to the sea (fishing and seafood) and in those indirectly related but which were also damaged after the catastrophe, the government of Aznar held in A Coruña a Council extraordinary meeting of Ministers where an ambitious set of aid was approved and the launch of different initiatives aimed at overcoming the environmental, social and economic consequences derived from the Prestige. The different measures approved included direct aid to the sectors affected by the cessation of activity.

Its objectives were:

- Environmental regeneration of the affected areas.
- Promote rebalancing and territorial cohesion through new infrastructures that serve to enhance the economic development of Galicia.
- Boost productive investment in Galicia.
- Sectoral diversification of economic activity, promoting the development of new sectors.
- Enhance the image of Galicia.

It was structured in 13 sectors and included different actions, among which we can cite:

- 1,000 million for the regeneration of the coast (500 for actions at sea, 350 for the regeneration of the coast, 75 for the National Park of the Atlantic Islands and another 75 for other projects).
- 676 million for internal motorways (Pontevedra-A Cañiza and Chantada-Monforte).
- 2,946 million for new high-speed train lines (Ferrol-Bilbao Cantabrian railway corridor, Ponferrada-Monforte connection and the Lugo-A Coruña section).
- Outer port of A Coruña.
- Line of soft loans ICO (Official Credit Institute) at zero or low interest, to repair or replace damaged facilities or to finance new investments.
- Regional incentive programs and rural development.
- Start-up of new parks and industrial estates in the affected areas.
- Construction of an oceanographic research vessel.
- It helps research programs in the field of prevention and fight against marine pollution.
- Facilitate access to the Internet in schools, libraries and rural areas.
- Increase aid to education (pre- and post-doctoral scholarships) and to universities for training and research and material and infrastructure related to environmental research.
- National and international promotion campaign for the image of Galician products, particularly those related to the sea.
- Fiscal aid for the economic activities developed in the affected areas.
- Plan of excellence and revitalization in the affected areas ( Costa da Morte, O Salnés and Ribadeo ), including a Parador on the Costa da Morte. Development of national and international promotion campaigns for Galicia as a tourist destination.
- Priority to Galicia for the organization of congresses and public events organized by the Administration during 2003.

== Political reactions ==
The main criticism formulated by the political forces of the opposition was the absence of time limits, which turned the Plan into a declaration of good intentions and mere propaganda of the Government. Under these conditions, it is impossible to assess the degree of compliance over the years

" The Government came to Galicia to present a mere declaration of intentions to clear its bad conscience. ... It does not define a calendar of actions, nor deadlines for the execution of any of the projects, nor does it commit to the necessary budget changes, even for the next three years." Pérez Touriño, 25.01.2003 ( La Voz de Galicia, 26.01.2003).

On the other hand, only 40% of the Plan corresponded to new actions while the remaining 60% collected initiatives planned - and budgeted - already before the catastrophe, which were now presented as novelties. Thus, for example, the Pontevedra-A Cañiza highway had already been promised by the PP ten years earlier.

The Council of Ministers at which it was approved was held at the Palacio de María Pita, home of the A Coruña council. Fraga, Paco Vázquez (mayor of A Coruña) and Martín Villa (appointed a few days earlier as Government Commissioner for the Prestige disaster) were present among the public attending the subsequent press conference.

Paco Vázquez, who in addition to acting as host to the ministers sat with them at the press conference and posed for the family photo of the cabinet, declared himself proud and honored by the celebration of the Council in the city and praised the conclusions. At the same press conference, Aznar announced the granting of the Grand Cross of the Order of Isabel la Católica to the mayor, thanking him for his hospitality

" The Galicia Plan basically coincides with what was expressed by Zapatero the day before, which means the existence of a clear political commitment on the part of all the parties " Paco Vázquez, 25.01.2003 (La Voz de Galicia, 26.01.2003).

Beiras, spokesperson for the BNG, assured that the plan was " a farce " and that " the PP thinks it can buy the Galicians ".

In front of the Palace, a group of demonstrators called by Nunca Máis expressed their revulsion against the Government and against Paco Vázquez himself and unsuccessfully tried to enter the square of María Pita, which prevented the strong police presence; 45 Nunca Más flags waved on the balconies of the square.

Paco Vázquez was the only socialist who distanced himself from the opposition's protest against the Government, which caused him to distance himself definitively from Rodríguez Zapatero (Secretary General of the PSOE since 2000). In 2006 he was appointed ambassador to the Holy See in the Vatican and returned to A Coruña in 2011, when he was relieved of his duties, but without any political prominence.

== Notes ==
1. La Voz de Galicia, 25.01.2003.
2. ↑ That is, the payment to the anti-pollution vessels that operated at sea and to the sailors who collected the fuel oil, but it does not include the cost of recovering the fuel oil left on the wreck, the amount of which was unknown at the time.
3. ↑ The promised inn in Muxía was indeed built, but after 20 years, and was inaugurated in 2022 ("El parador de Muxía officially opens 28 months after its opening to the public", in La Voz de Galicia, 23.10.2022).
4. ^ 1,000 according to the national police, 3,500 according to the municipal police, 7,000 according to the organizers ( La voz de Galicia, 25.01.2003).
5. ^ "Zapatero names the mayor of A Coruña as new ambassador to the Vatican", article in El País, February 11, 2006 (in Spanish.
