= London P&I Club =

British protection and indemnity insurance group

London P&I
- Type: Public
- Industry: Financial services
- Headquarters: London, Hong Kong, Ionion Building, Piraeus
- Key people: John M. Lyras, Chairman, James Bean, CEO
- Products: Insurance
- Number of employees: 72 (2017)
- Website: https://www.londonpandi.com/

London P&I, formerly known as The London P&I Club, is a group of protection and indemnity insurance (P&I) companies providing mutual maritime insurance for shipowners and charterers. The principal legal entity is The London Steam-Ship Owners' Mutual Insurance Association Limited, founded and registered in England 1866, incorporated in 1875. London P&I offers Protection and Indemnity (P&I), Freight, Demurrage and Defence (FD&D), war risks and related maritime insurance products. It is a member of the International Group of P&I Clubs, an umbrella for thirteen separate clubs insuring 90% of the world's ocean-going freighters.

== History ==
=== 1866-1899 ===
In 1866, George Hodgkinson (born 1817), a London shipowner at age 30 and member of the British Merchant Navy sailing to Australia, China, India, and investor in Australian mining, founded the London Club as a mutual insurance company specifically for steamships, and ran it in conjunction with William Baglehole, a business man with political connections, sitting on the Committee on Merchant Shipping of the Foreign Secretary and behind one of the first war risk associations, set up in response to American Civil War impacts on British shipping. They had already established two other mutual clubs covering sailing ships, the British Shipowners’ Association, but sailing ships became less and less important in transporting goods; the Shipowners’ Association did not survive the First World War.

The London Club members met at the London Tavern each week to decide on claims.The Club's managers reported to the three member-Club Committee. In 1875, the London Club turned itself into an incorporated company limited by guarantee, as did the other 7 existing mutual clubs in the UK. By 1878–79, all but 3 of the 559 steamships insured in the "protecting class" were British-owned. As international shipping became more and more regulated, including local laws, the scale and scope of claims for personal injury and cargo damage increased. In 1889, the Club added an "indemnity class", covering shipowner liability for the loss, damage or short delivery of cargo (hence P&I). In 1890, Sir George's son, G L Hodgkinson retired, and A Bilbrough & Co took over the Club's management. By 1890 the Club insured only 306 but increasingly bigger vessels. Kenneth Bilbrough's used aggressive business tactics, including his old boy network, The Club was one of the original members of the "London Group of mutual clubs", the forerunner of the International Group of P&I Clubs, which in 1899 made a pooling agreement to share the cost of major claims over and above a set figure according to each club's proportion of the group's aggregate tonnage.

=== 1900-1945 ===
After 1900, the Club developed strong links with US shippers from the East Coast competing with Johnson & Higgins. By 1912, the Club covered a million tons of shipping and added a War Risks Class.

During the First World War and the trade depression afterwards the club's insured tonnage declined; the British government covered ship damage due to war up to 80% and by 1917 to 100%. British shipping though still the world's largest merchant fleet was waning. The 1916 economic sanctions against Germany, meant British clubs could no longer offer neutral ships like US vessels insurance, which prompted foundation of the US P&I club in 1917. US ships remained a major part of the Club's tonnage between the wars. In 1929 new members were Greek and Norwegian owners. Cargo, personal injury and sickness claims predominated. The civil war in Spain and Japan's invasion of China brought many claims and rapidly special premiums were imposed. During the Second World War, ships were lost but the Club's size increased slightly. The Club's vital documents were filmed and safely stored in Exeter.

=== 1945-1962 ===
From 1945-1962 shipping flourished, with world seaborne trade almost tripling from 1948 to more than 1.3 billion tonnes in 1960. Demand for energy and oil trade produced bigger and bigger tankers. The main source of claims for the Club continued to be personal injury, and rising cost of litigation but the recognition of oil pollution’s environmental impact as a major liability for shipowners provoked a debate on limiting owners’ liability. As the UK fleet declined, the Club increased its tonnage by expanding to Greek owners, and recruiting new fleets from Hong Kong and Korea. In 1962, the first non-British member, the Greek Marcos Lyras, was invited to join the Committee.

=== 1962-2002 ===
From 1962-1989 the container ship completely changed cargo handling and further internationalisation of shipping. In 1969, the Club formed an overseas re-insurance subsidiary in the Bahamas, which it changed to the Bermudas in 1972, and one in Guernsey in 1971 holding 80% of its assets. In 1979, the Club's tonnage peaked with a record number of 2,721 ships, of which 366 were tankers. This changed the Club's membership with the first overseas chairman in the 1970s and the first of two overseas offices was opened. Enormous oil spills like the Torrey Canyon Disaster in 1967, the 1978 Amoco Cadiz oil spill and the Exxon Valdez oil spill confirmed earlier fears of liability.

In the mid-1980s the depressed freight markets caused very low claims, but also brought fewer premium level members. Later in the decade the Club, like many others, experienced a sharp and persistent increase in the cost of claims, and by 1989, it had to significantly increase contributions.

From 1989–2002, the Club lost tonnage, financial difficulties unfolded. It made a series of reforms in the early 1990s with the Committee taking a more active role in the Club's affairs on re-insurance and limiting cover, which also shaped International Group policies.

=== Since 2002 ===
The London P&I Club is the insurer of the MV Prestige, the oil tanker responsible for the Prestige oil spill in 2002. In January 2016 the Spanish Supreme Court held the London P&I Club liable for damages up to the amount of its overall cover for the shipowner for pollution of $1 billion. In October 2023, the English High Court declined to enforce the ruling, according to established precedent that the arbitration must happen in English courts in whole.

From 2002-2016 the club expanded in spite of the 2008 financial crisis.

== See also ==
- Protection and indemnity insurance
