= Señoráns =

Village in Galicia, Spain

Coordinates: 43.303°N 8.353°W

- Village
- Señoráns
- Interactive map of Señoráns
- Country: Spain
- Autonomous Community: Galicia
- Province: A Coruña
- Municipality: Vimianzo
- Parroquia: Salto

Population (2009)
  - Total: 86

Señoráns is a village in the municipality of Vimianzo, the province of A Coruña, Galicia, northwestern Spain. Señoráns is part of the parroquia of Salto. It had 86 inhabitants (INE 2009).
