= NorthStandard =

British marine insurance provider

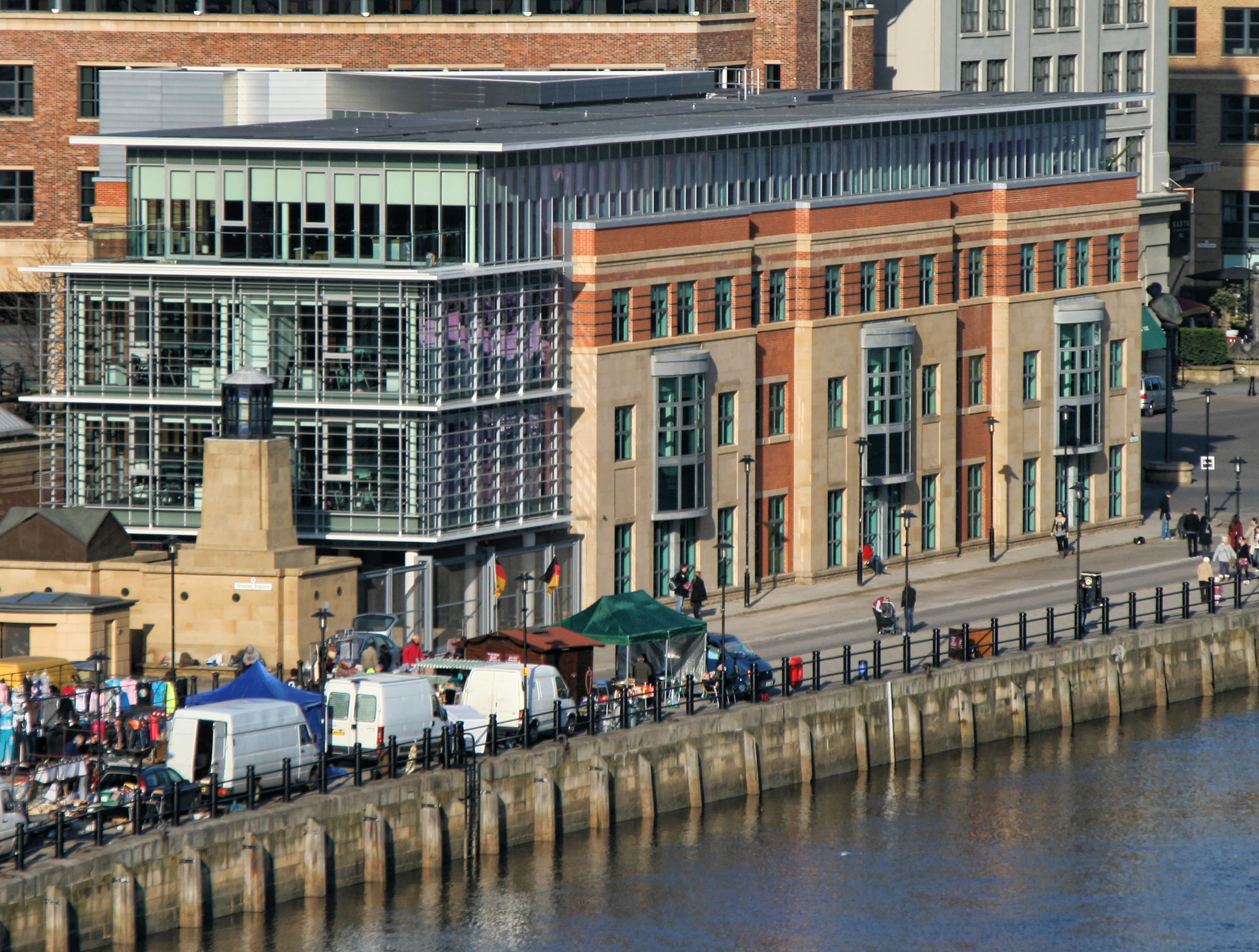
- Office in Newcastle upon Tyne, UK
- Type: Mutual
- Industry: Insurance
- Founded: 1860
- Headquarters: Newcastle upon Tyne, United Kingdom
- Website: north-standard.com

NorthStandard is a marine mutual liability insurer in the United Kingdom.

In May 2022, it was announced that the North of England P&I Association would merge with The Standard Club UK LTD (the Standard Club). The merger took place during Q1, 2023, and the new organisation is called NorthStandard.

NorthStandard provides protection and indemnity (P&I), freight demurrage and defence (FD&D), war risks and ancillary insurance cover, and loss prevention services to around 180 million GT of owned tonnage and 90 million GT of chartered tonnage, with around 3500 ships worldwide. Through its guaranteed subsidiary Sunderland Marine, NorthStandard is also an insurer of fishing vessels, small craft and aquaculture risks. The P&I Club is a leading member of the International Group of P&I Clubs, with 12% of the group's owned tonnage. It employs almost 700 people worldwide.

The North P&I Club was founded in 1860 and headquartered in Newcastle-upon-Tyne, UK, with regional offices in Greece, China (Shanghai and Hong Kong), Japan, Singapore, Ireland and the United States. The Standard P&I Club was fully known as the Standard Steamship Owners Protection & Indemnity Association and was founded in 1884.

== Background ==
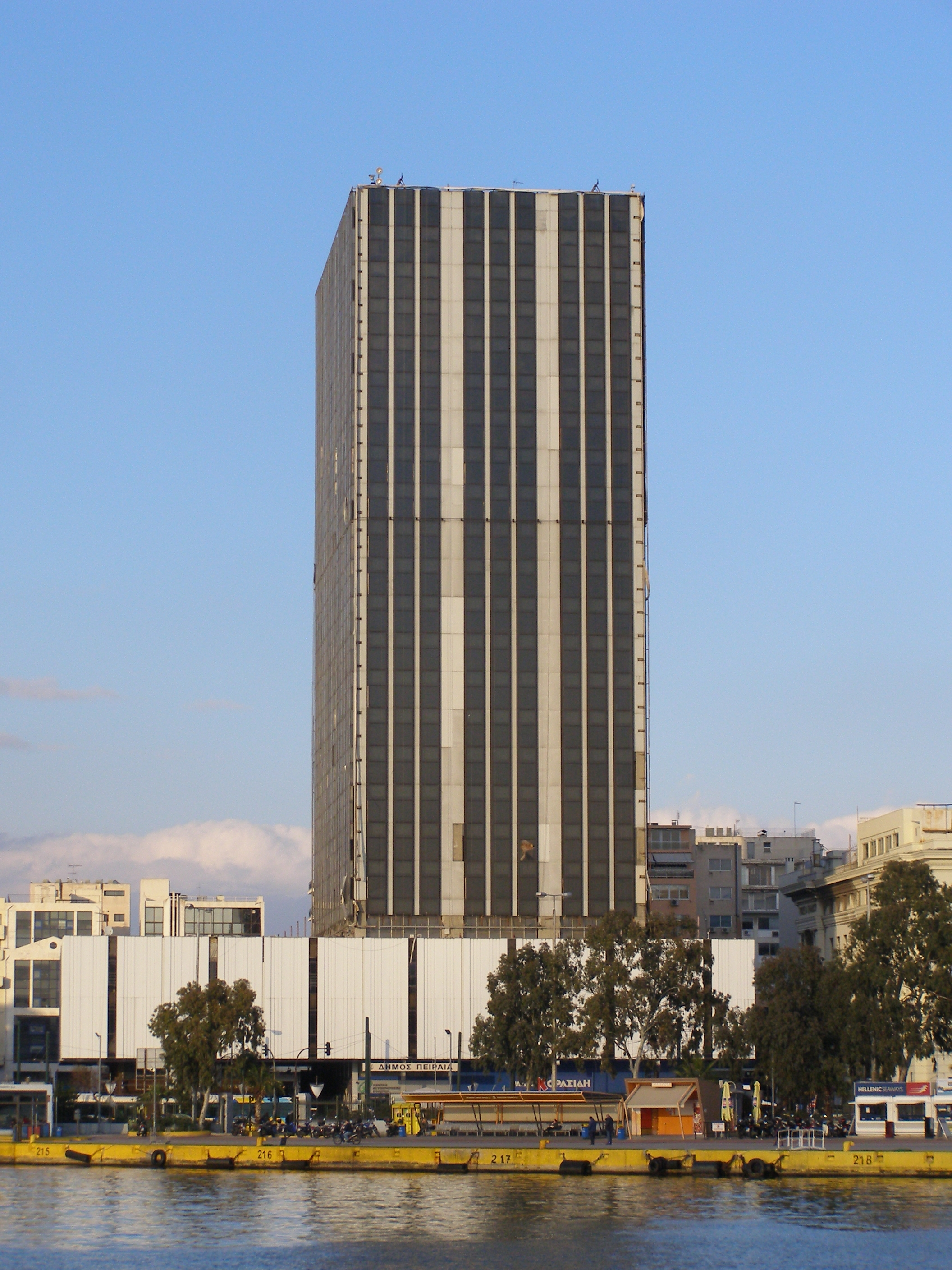
Office in Piraeus, Greece

North P&I Club started with the North of England Iron Steam Ship Protecting Association in Newcastle upon Tyne. It had formed from a series of amalgamations in 1860. It was one of the world's first mutual associations providing personal injury and collision liability cover for steamships. In 1885, North P&I Club added cargo indemnity cover by merging with the local Steam Ship Owners’ Mutual and, by 1914, had become the leading P&I club in Britain.

North P&I Club lost business after World War II with the decline of the British merchant navy. A gradual revival began in the 1960s with the appointment of managers Alec Murray and Len Harrison. North P&I Club became a member of the London Group of protecting and indemnity (P&I) clubs in 1969, which later became the International Group. North P&I Club opened branch offices in Hong Kong in 1995, Greece in 2000, Singapore in 2007 and Japan in 2012.

The tradition of two managing directors, which first started in 1885, continued with the appointment of the joint management team of Peter Crichton and Rodney Eccleston in 1988 and by their successors Alan Wilson and Paul Jennings in 2009.

The Standard Club, founded in 1884, expanded globally and developed expertise in the freight, chartering, and international shipping sectors. In 1899, it became one of the first clubs to participate in a pooling agreement with five other British P&I clubs. This agreement laid the foundation for what would later become the International Group of P&I Clubs, which grew in membership and international representation over time.

== Corporate development ==
Much of the P&I Club's growth since the 1960s has been due to mergers and acquisitions of smaller clubs. In 1967, North P&I Club absorbed the neighbouring Neptune P&I Club, bringing a number of Irish and Yugoslav vessels. On 20 February 1998, it merged with the Newcastle Club, adding some 5 million GT of shipping and 30 staff. Two years later, North P&I Club absorbed the business of the Liverpool and London Club, adding another 5 million GT.

=== Sunderland Marine and the North Group ===
On 28 February 2014, North P&I Club acquired Sunderland Marine Mutual Insurance Company Limited, a leading insurer of fishing vessels, small craft and aquaculture risks.

Established in 1882 in Sunderland, Sunderland Marine is now based in Newcastle-upon-Tyne following the 2014 merger with global marine mutual insurer North. North is authorised by the UK's Prudential Regulation Authority and regulated by the Financial Conduct Authority and the Prudential Regulation Authority. Together, North Group has offices and subsidiaries in Australia and New Zealand, Hong Kong and Shanghai, Greece, Ireland, Japan, Singapore, and the United States, and has an S&P Global ‘A’ rating.

=== The merger between North and The Standard Club ===
In February 2023, North P&I Club merged with The Standard Club. The decision was based on aligned values and a shared objective to establish a larger P&I club.

The combined entity operates as a mutual insurer and focuses on adapting to developments within the maritime sector.

In November 2025, NorthStandard was recognised for its Outstanding Contribution to Skills and Community on the Maritime Innovation Week Awards 2025.

== Products and services ==
=== P&I ===
Cover shipowners' legal liabilities for incidents such as injury to crew, passengers, or third parties, as well as environmental damage. The insurance is comprehensive and includes cover for third party legal liabilities in respect of:

- People claims
- Collisions
- Damage to fixed and floating objects
- Pollution
- Wreck removal
- Cargo claims
- Fines or other penalties.

The P&I Club operates comprehensive pre-employment medical schemes in the Philippines and Ukraine. It has also developed a ‘First Call’ service for crew landed and requiring treatment in the US, and a post-repatriation medical scheme specifically for Filipino crewmembers.

=== FD&D ===
An ancillary product, covering a wide range of legal costs for disputes over contracts, cargo claim, or collisions. Freight, demurrage and defence insurance (FD&D) protects members’ interests and assets by supporting them to recover any proper claims for uninsured losses and/or to defend and resist any actions improperly brought against them that fall within the remit of the club's rules.

It covers legal costs and expenses properly incurred in all types of dispute falling outside the scope of P&I, hull and machinery, loss of hire and time charterers’ liability for damage to hull insurances. Most of the disputes referred to the FD&D team are charter party disputes, but it also handles a large number of queries and claims concerning:

- Bills of lading
- Guarantees and letters of indemnity
- Sale and purchase contracts
- Newbuilding contracts
- Bunker (and other) suppliers
- Stevedores
- Underwriters
- Crew
- Other matters connected to contracts of affreightment and carriage.

=== Strike & Delay ===
Provides coverage for losses due to delays resulting from strikes, port closures, collisions, breakdowns, and other unexpected disruptions.

=== Coastal & Inland ===
Provides cover for all types of smaller commercial vessels, usually up to $500m and typically up to 10,000GT.

=== Offshore & Renewables ===
Providing full insurance services dedicated to shipowners, charterers, operators, as well as energy and utility companies across exploration, construction, installation, production, and supply.

=== War Risks ===
An ancillary product, covering damage or loss caused by deliberate acts of third parties, including war, civil war, revolution, capture and seizure, weapons of war, piracy, and terrorism

=== Loss prevention ===
NorthStandard provides risk management services through its loss prevention team, offering guidance and resource to support safe and efficient vessel operation.

=== Hull & Machinery ===
Providing cover for vessels against physical damage or total loss at sea. NorthStandard provides a combined insurance product designed for smaller & specialist vessels of under 10,000GT.

=== Get Set! ===
A suite of loss prevention tools focusing on shipboard safety & efficiency. Features include training in ECDIS, AI based hazard detection and enhanced ship-to-shore collaboration.
