= Terra de Soneira =

Coordinates: 43°7′N 9°3′W

- Comarca
- Flag Coat of arms
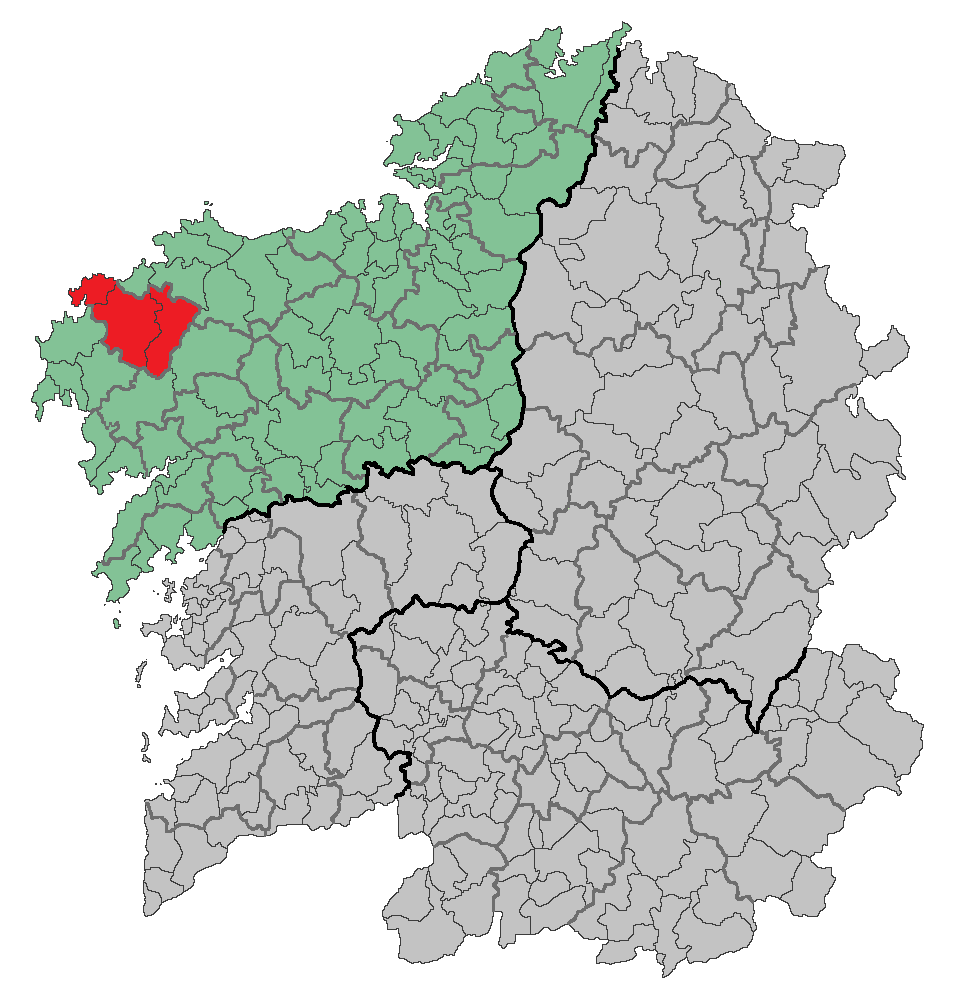
- Country: Spain
- Autonomous community: Galicia
- Province: A Coruña
- Capital: Vimianzo
- Municipalities: List: Camariñas, Vimianzo, Zas

Area
  - Total: 370.7 km^{2} (143.1 sq mi)

Population
  - Total: 20,886
  - Density: 56.34/km^{2} (145.9/sq mi)
- Demonym: Soneirense
- Time zone: UTC+1 (CET)
  - Summer (DST): UTC+2 (CEST)

Terra de Soneira is a comarca in the Galician Province of A Coruña, Spain. The overall population of this local region is 20,886 (2005).

== Municipalities ==
Camariñas, Vimianzo, and Zas.
