= Zas, Spain =

Coordinates: 43°06′N 8°54′W

Zas
- Municipality
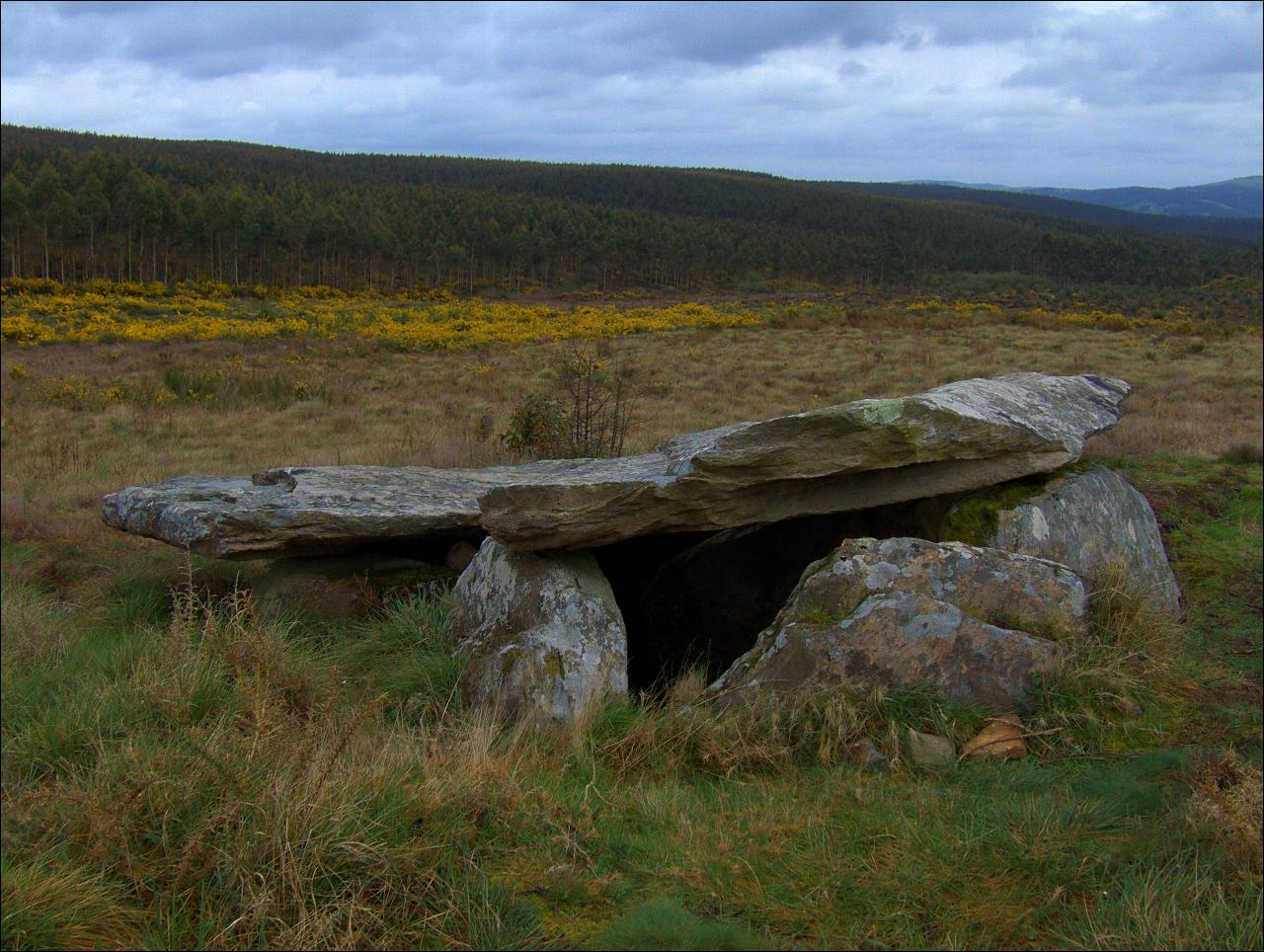

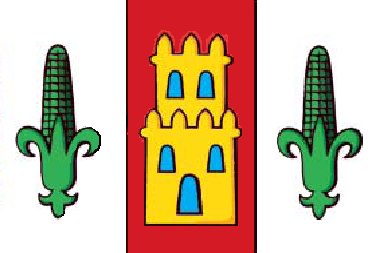
- Flag Coat of arms

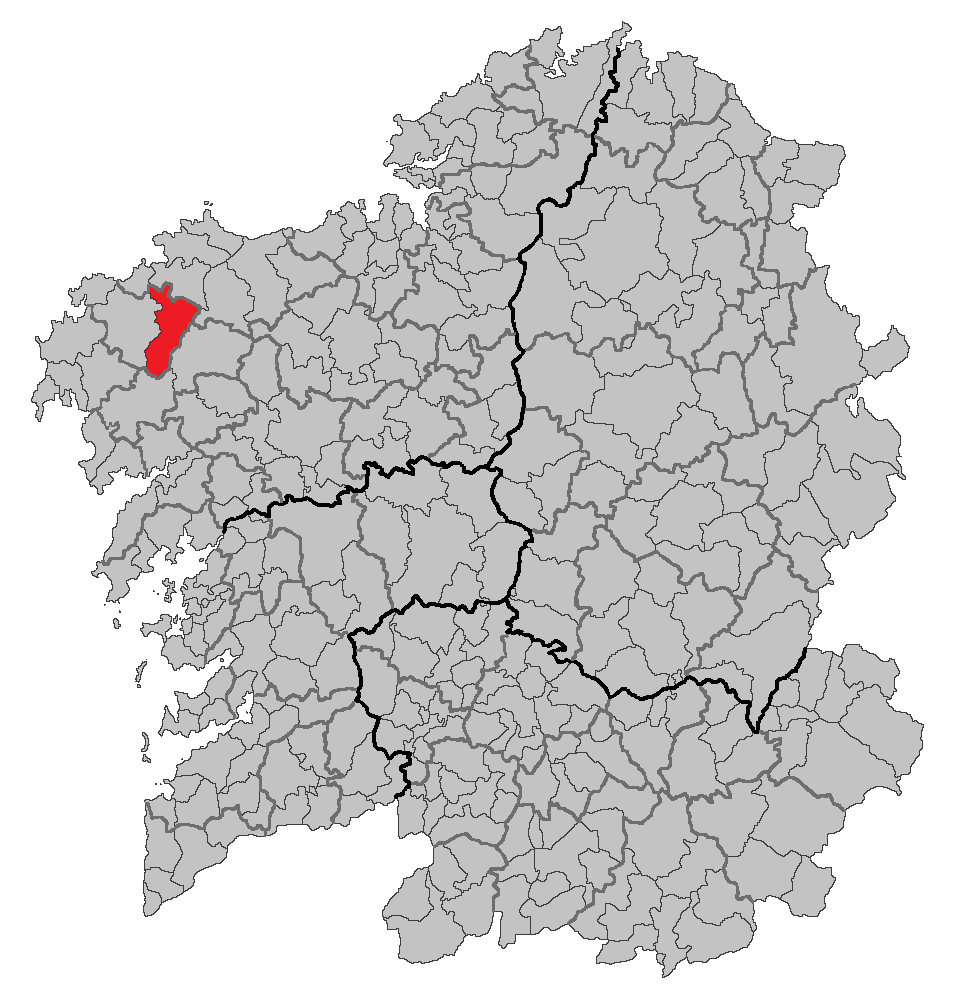
- Location of Zas within Galicia
- Country: Spain
- Autonomous community: Galicia
- Province: A Coruña
- Comarca: Terra de Soneira

Government
  - Alcalde (Mayor): Manuel Muíño Espasandín (BNG)

Area
  - Total: 133.68 km^{2} (51.61 sq mi)

Population (2025-01-01)
  - Total: 4,199
  - Density: 31.41/km^{2} (81.35/sq mi)
- Time zone: UTC+1 (CET)
  - Summer (DST): UTC+2 (CEST)

Zas is a municipality in the province of A Coruña, in the autonomous community of Galicia, Spain. It belongs to the comarca of Terra de Soneira.

== Parishes ==
The municipality of Zas has 16 parishes (Galician: parroquias):

- Allo
- Baio
- Brandomil
- Brandoñas
- Carreira
- Castro
- Gándara
- Lamas
- Loroño
- Meanos
- Mira
- Muíño
- Pazos
- Roma
- Vilar
- Zas

== See also ==
- List of municipalities in A Coruña
