= Camariñas =

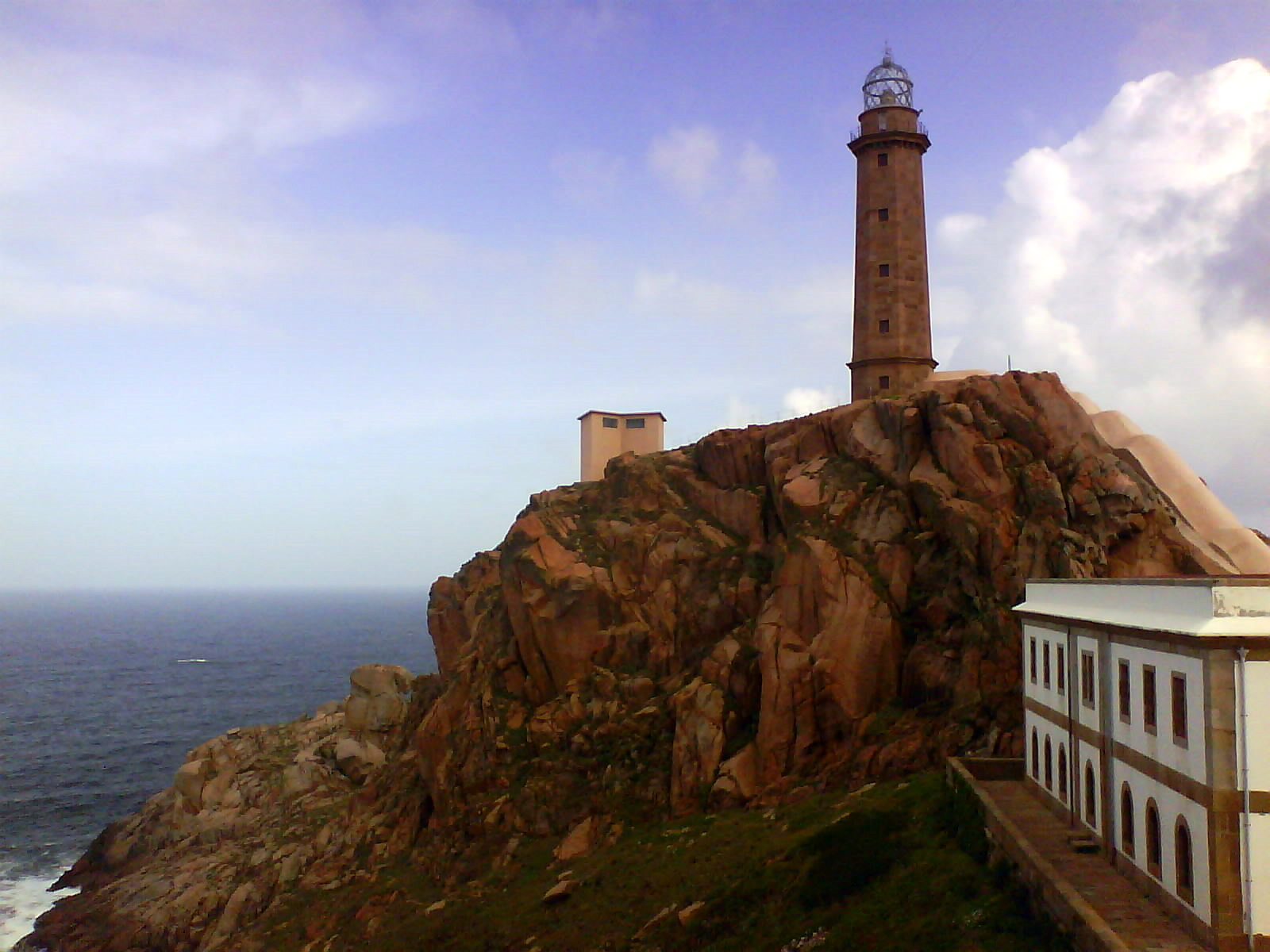
- Cabo Vilán, northwest of Camariñas

- Coat of arms

- Location within Province of A Coruña Location within Galicia Location within Spain
- Coordinates: 43°7′48″N 9°11′6″W
- Country: Spain
- Autonomous community: Galicia
- Province: A Coruña
- Comarca: Terra de Soneira
- Partido judicial: Corcubión

Government
  - Mayor: Manuel Valeriano Alonso de León

Area
  - Total: 51.60 km^{2} (19.92 sq mi)

Population (2025-01-01)
  - Total: 5,075
  - Density: 98.35/km^{2} (254.7/sq mi)
- Time zone: UTC+1 (CET)
  - Summer (DST): UTC+2 (CEST)
- Website: www.camarinas.net

Camariñas is a municipality in the province of A Coruña in the autonomous community of Galicia in northwestern Spain. It belongs to the comarca of Terra de Soneira. An important fishing center, it is renowned all over Spain by the bobbin lace work of its women (the palilleiras).

To the northwest are the impressive cliffs of Cape Vilan (Cabo Vilán "Cape Villain", due to bad currents and many wrecks), a protected natural site.

== Geography and climate ==
Camariñas has a warm-summer Mediterranean climate (Köppen: Csb, Trewartha: Csll). Being located at the northwestern tip of the Iberian Peninsula, the climate is greatly modulated by the Atlantic Ocean.

Climate data for Camariñas (Cabo Vilán) WMO ID: 08006; Climate ID: 1393; coordinates 43°09′38″N 09°12′39″W; elevation: 50 m (160 ft); 1991–2020 normals, extremes 1994–present
Month	Jan	Feb	Mar	Apr	May	Jun	Jul	Aug	Sep	Oct	Nov	Dec	Year
Record high °C (°F)	19.6 (67.3)	21.6 (70.9)	24.2 (75.6)	29.2 (84.6)	27.9 (82.2)	30.6 (87.1)	34.4 (93.9)	32.0 (89.6)	32.9 (91.2)	29.1 (84.4)	23.8 (74.8)	19.9 (67.8)	34.4 (93.9)
Mean daily maximum °C (°F)	12.3 (54.1)	12.4 (54.3)	13.8 (56.8)	14.9 (58.8)	16.3 (61.3)	18.4 (65.1)	19.7 (67.5)	20.3 (68.5)	19.5 (67.1)	18.0 (64.4)	14.7 (58.5)	13.4 (56.1)	16.2 (61.2)
Daily mean °C (°F)	10.2 (50.4)	10.1 (50.2)	11.3 (52.3)	12.3 (54.1)	13.9 (57.0)	15.9 (60.6)	17.4 (63.3)	17.6 (63.7)	17.3 (63.1)	15.6 (60.1)	12.6 (54.7)	11.3 (52.3)	13.8 (56.8)
Mean daily minimum °C (°F)	8.0 (46.4)	7.7 (45.9)	8.8 (47.8)	9.7 (49.5)	11.4 (52.5)	13.4 (56.1)	15.0 (59.0)	15.5 (59.9)	14.7 (58.5)	13.1 (55.6)	10.4 (50.7)	9.0 (48.2)	11.4 (52.5)
Record low °C (°F)	0.3 (32.5)	−0.8 (30.6)	−0.2 (31.6)	4.3 (39.7)	6.0 (42.8)	9.3 (48.7)	10.7 (51.3)	11.7 (53.1)	10.5 (50.9)	6.0 (42.8)	4.6 (40.3)	0.6 (33.1)	−0.8 (30.6)
Average precipitation mm (inches)	152.2 (5.99)	79.2 (3.12)	68.8 (2.71)	87.2 (3.43)	76.5 (3.01)	43.5 (1.71)	24.7 (0.97)	35.0 (1.38)	63.4 (2.50)	127.4 (5.02)	149.8 (5.90)	132.4 (5.21)	1,040.1 (40.95)
Average precipitation days (≥ 0.1 mm)	19.25	14.25	12.56	14.69	14.33	11.16	9.06	10.63	12.50	17.46	19.80	19.69	175.37
Average relative humidity (%)	79	77	75	78	80	81	82	80	80	81	79	79	79
Source: State Meteorological Agency/AEMET OpenData

== Demography ==
From: INE Archiv

== Gallery ==
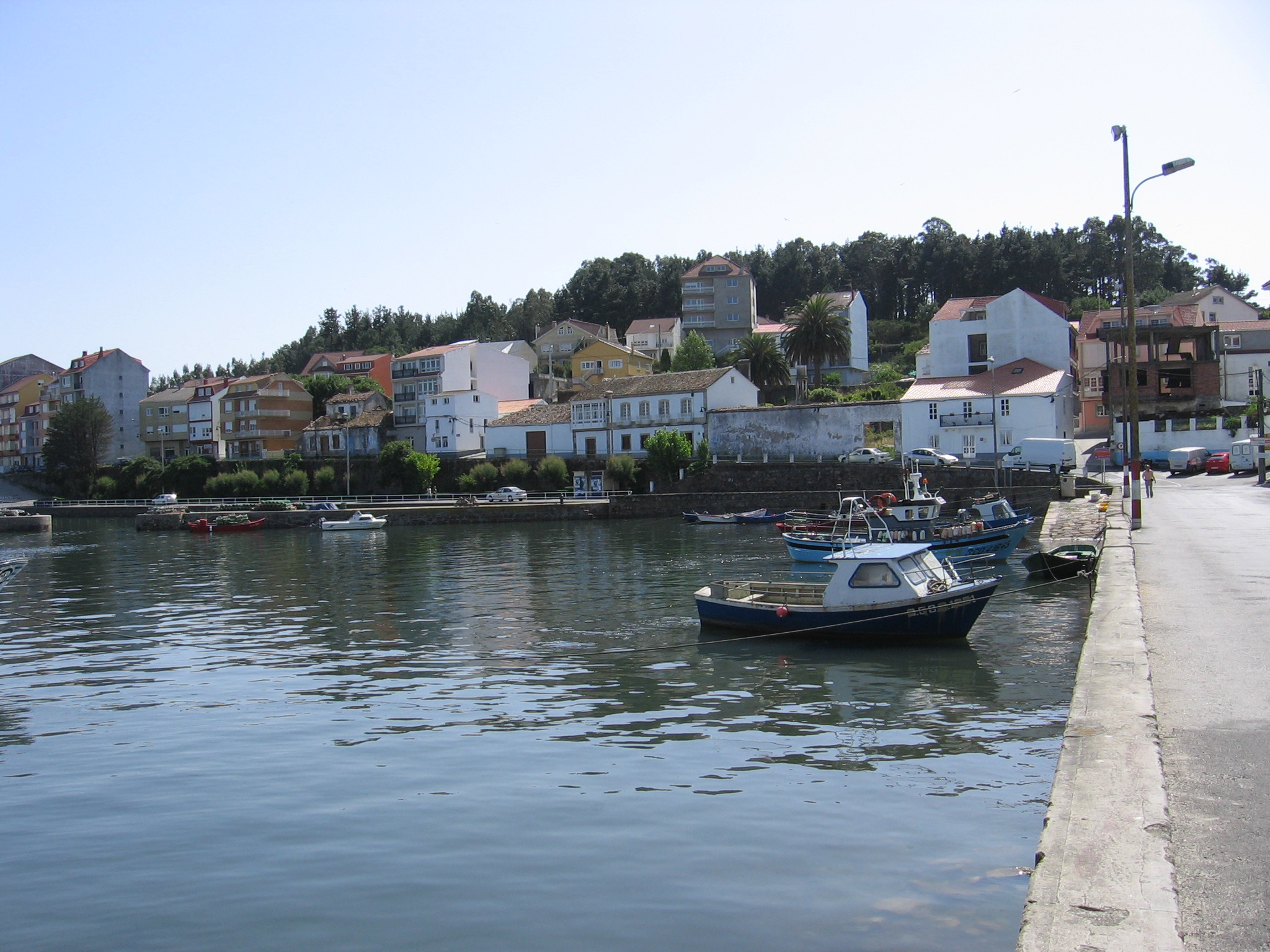
Fishing harbor, Camariñas

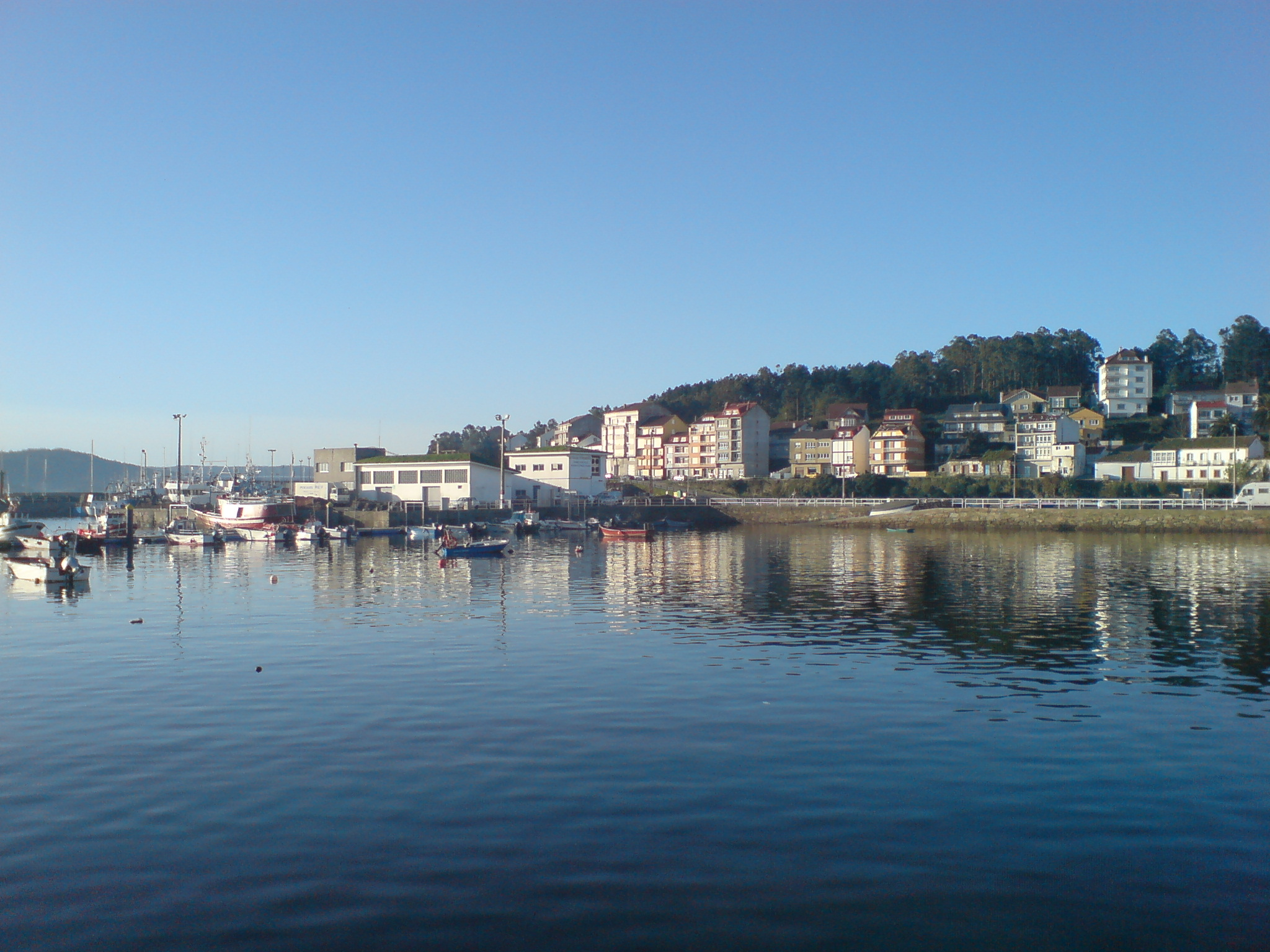
Bay of Camariñas

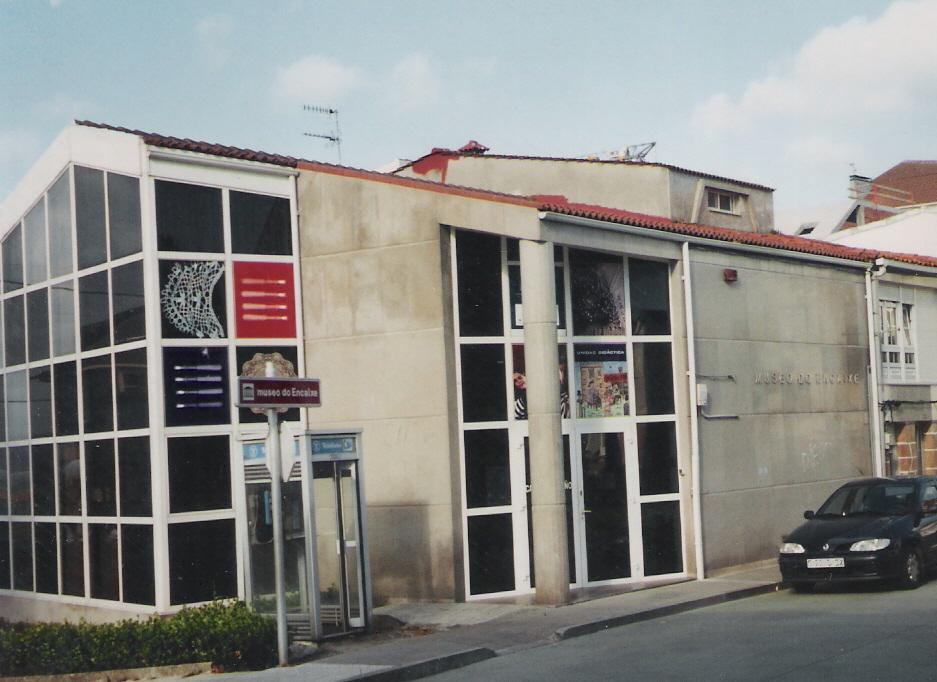
Museum of Bobbin Lace

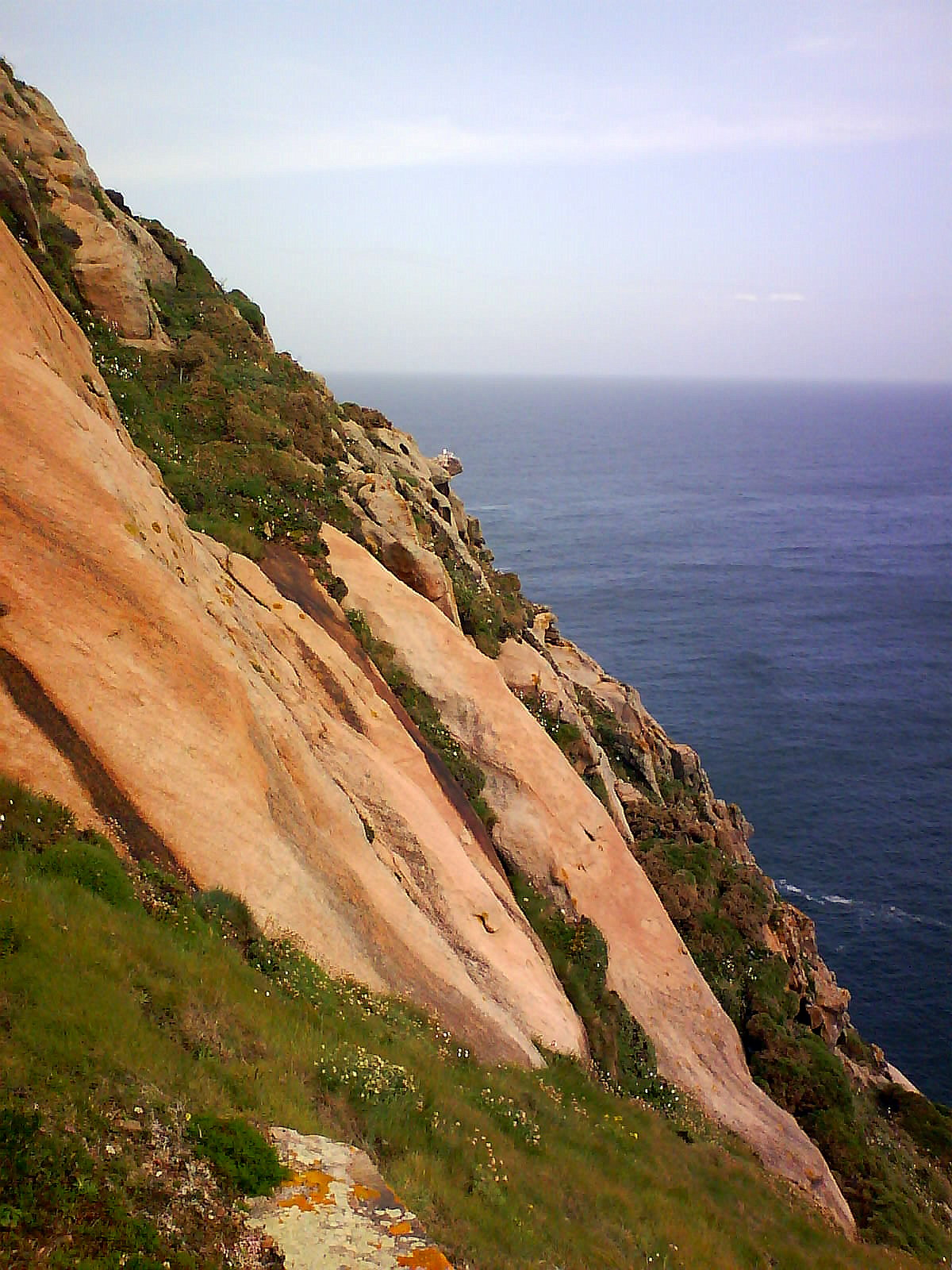
Cliffs of Cabo Vilán

== See also ==
List of municipalities in A Coruña
