= Place of refuge for ships =

Principle in international maritime law

A place of refuge for ships is a safe harbor or other secure place where a ship in distress can safely be taken to "prevent further damage or deterioration of the ship".

It is often claimed that under international maritime law, "no port may be closed to a foreign ship seeking shelter from storm or bad weather or otherwise compelled to enter it in distress, unless another equally safe port is open".

However, there are many limitations to this principle, especially when the ship may pose environmental or other dangers to the port.

== Bibliography ==
- Anthony Morrison, Places of Refuge for Ships in Distress: Problems and Methods of Resolution, 07 June 2012 ISBN 9789004218888 in Legal Aspects of Sustainable Development 12.
