= Marine salvage =

Recovering a ship or cargo after a maritime casualty

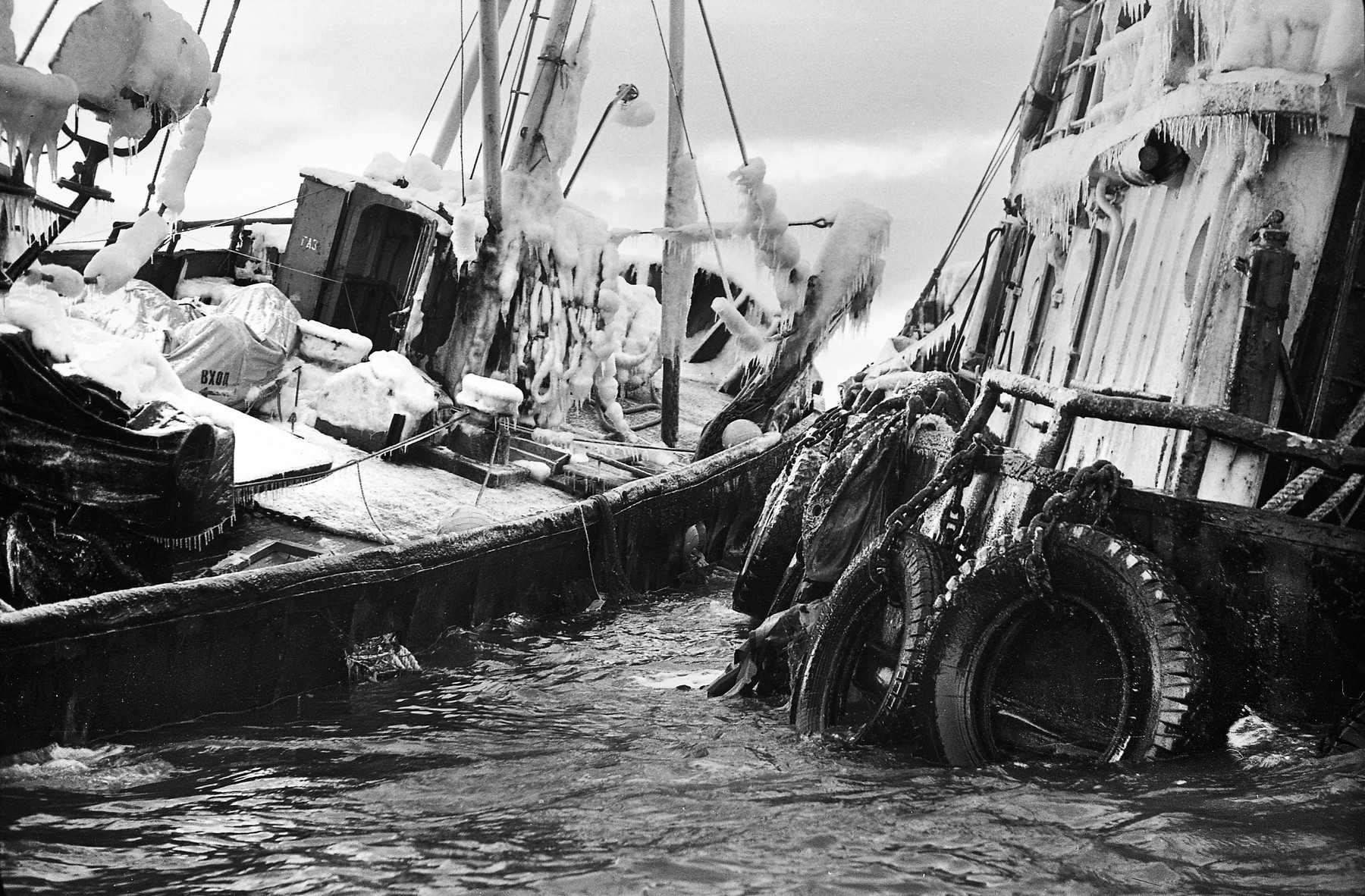
A fishing boat being salvaged off the Estonian coast, 1973

Marine salvage is the process of recovering a ship and its cargo after a shipwreck or other maritime casualty. Salvage may encompass towing, lifting a vessel, or effecting repairs to a ship. Salvors are normally paid for their efforts. However, protecting the coastal environment from oil spillages or other contaminants from a modern ship can also be a motivator, as oil, cargo, and other pollutants can easily leak from a wreck and in these instances, governments or authorities may organise the salvage.

Before the invention of radio, salvage services would be given to a stricken vessel by any passing ship. Today, most salvage is carried out by specialist salvage firms with dedicated crews and equipment. The legal significance of salvage is that a successful salvor (Note: salvor: A person or company involved in salvage activities.) is entitled to a reward, which is a proportion of the total value of the ship and its cargo. The bounty is determined subsequently at a "hearing on the merits" by a maritime court in accordance with Articles 13 and 14 of the International Salvage Convention of 1989. The common law concept of salvage was established by the English Admiralty Court and is defined as "a voluntary successful service provided in order to save maritime property in danger at sea, entitling the salvor to a reward"; this definition has been further refined by the 1989 Convention.

Originally, a "successful" salvage was one where at least part of the ship or cargo was saved; otherwise, the principle of "No Cure, No Pay" meant that the salvor would get nothing. In the 1970s, a number of marine casualties of single-skin-hull tankers led to serious oil spills. Such casualties were discouraging to salvors, so the Lloyd's Open Form (LOF) made provision that a salvor who attempts to prevent environmental damage will be paid, even if unsuccessful. This Lloyd's initiative was later incorporated into the 1989 Convention.

All vessels have an international duty to give reasonable assistance to other ships in distress to save lives, but there is no obligation to try to save the vessel. Any offer of salvage assistance may be refused; if it is accepted, a contract automatically arises to give the successful salvor the right to a reward under the 1989 Convention. Typically, the ship and salvor will sign up to an LOF agreement so that the terms of salvage are clear. Since 2000, it has become standard to append a SCOPIC ("Special Compensation – P&I Clubs") clause to the LOF to ensure that a salvor does not abuse the aforementioned environmental policy stated in the 1989 Convention (pursuant to the case of The Nagasaki Spirit).

The techniques applied in marine salvage are largely a matter of adapting available materials and equipment to the situation, which are often constrained by urgencies, weather and sea conditions, site accessibility, and financial considerations. Diving is slow, labour-intensive, dangerous, expensive, constrained by conditions, and often inefficient, but may be the only, or most efficient, way to do some tasks needed to complete the salvage job. Salvage work includes towing an abandoned or disabled vessel which is still afloat to safety, assisting in fighting a fire on board another vessel, refloating sunken or stranded vessels, righting a capsized vessel, recovering the cargo, stores, or equipment from a wreck, or demolishing it in place for scrap. The work may be done for profit, clearing a blocked shipping lane or harbour, or for preventing or limiting environmental damage.

== Types ==
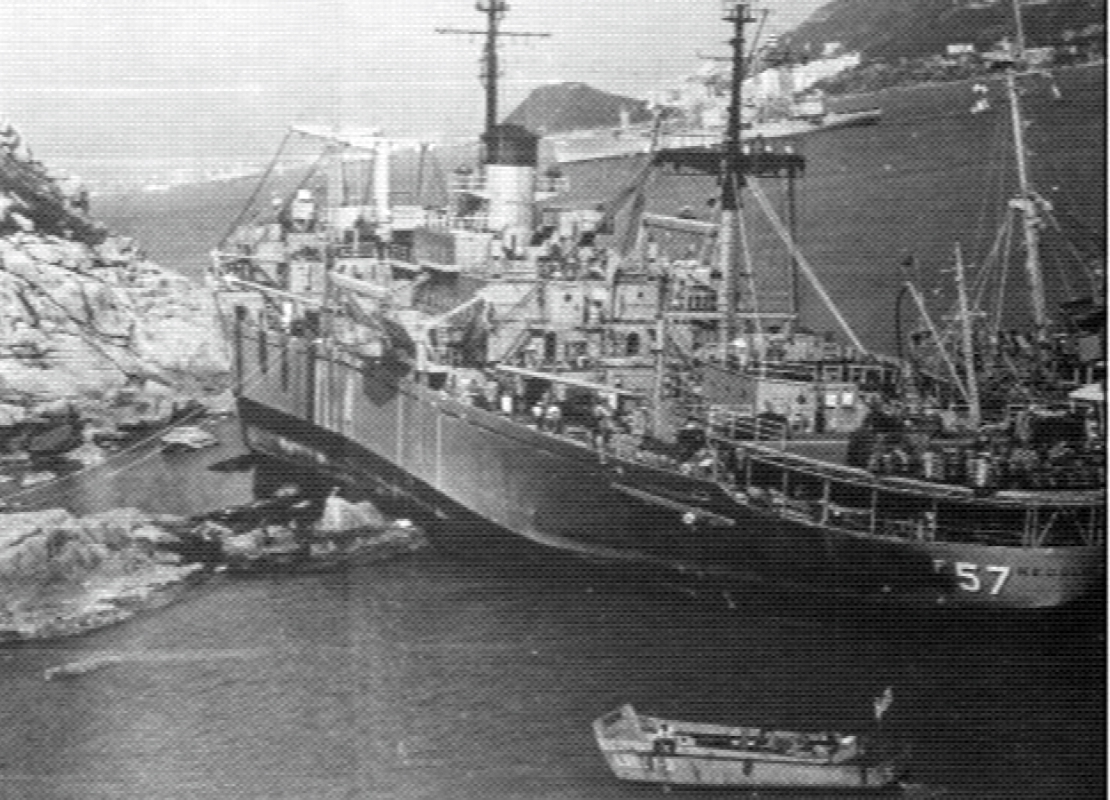
USS Regulus hard aground in 1971 due to a typhoon: after three weeks of effort, Naval salvors deemed it unsalvageable.

Marine salvage takes many forms, and may involve anything from refloating a ship that has gone aground or sunk as well as necessary work to prevent loss of the vessel, such as pumping water out of a ship to keep it afloat, or extinguishing fires on board, to clearing wreckage to remove navigational or ecological hazards, or recovery of cargo, fuel, stores, equipment, or scrap metal.

=== Contract salvage ===
In contract salvage the owner of the property and salvor enter into a salvage contract prior to the commencement of salvage operations and the amount that the salvor is paid is determined by the contract. This can be a fixed amount, based on a "time and materials" basis, or any other terms that both parties agree to. The contract may also state that payment is only due if the salvage operation is successful (a.k.a. "No Cure, No Pay"), or that payment is due even if the operation fails. An example of a contract salvage is Lloyd's Standard Form of Salvage Agreement (2011, superseded in 2020), an English law arbitration agreement administered by the Council of Lloyd's, London.

A ship that has broken down but is not in immediate danger is usually in a position to negotiate terms and may request to be towed to a safe haven on a commercial hire basis rather than in terms of a Lloyds Open Form.

If the casualty appears to be beyond salvage or at a high risk of sinking, breaking up, burning out or otherwise becoming uneconomical to salvage on a LOF, the salvage operator may change the contract from LOF to SCOPIC, which stipulates that all costs plus a reasonable profit are paid to the salvage operator by the casualty's insurers.

If the salvage operator is unable to salvage the vessel, they or a different salvage contractor may be requested to remain on site to help manage the risk of pollution or decrease the damage.

=== Pure salvage ===
In the United States, in pure salvage (also called merit salvage), there is no contract between the owner of the goods and the salvor. The relationship is one implied by law; the salvor of property under pure salvage must bring his claim for salvage in a court which has jurisdiction, and this will award salvage based upon the "merit" of the service as well as the value of the property itself.

Pure salvage claims are classified as "high-order" and "low-order" salvage. In high-order salvage, the salvor exposes their crew to risk of injury, and their equipment to damage or loss to salvage the property that is in peril. Examples of high-order salvage are boarding a sinking ship in heavy weather, boarding a ship which is on fire, raising a ship, plane, or other sunken property, or towing a ship which is in the surf away from the shore. In low-order salvage, the salvor is exposed to little or no personal risk. Examples of low-order salvage include towing another vessel in calm seas, supplying a vessel with fuel, or pulling a vessel off a sand bar. Salvors performing high-order salvage receive substantially greater rewards than those performing low-order salvage.

In order for a claim to be awarded, three requirements must be met: The property must be in peril, the service must be rendered voluntarily, and the salvage must be successful in whole or in part.

There are several factors the court uses to determine the salvor's amount. Some of these include the difficulty of the task, the risk involved to the salvor, the value of the property saved, the degree of danger to which the property was exposed, and the potential environmental impacts. Rarely, the salvage award would be greater than 50 percent of the salvaged property's value. Usually, salvage awards amount to 10–25% of the value of the property.

=== Naval salvage ===
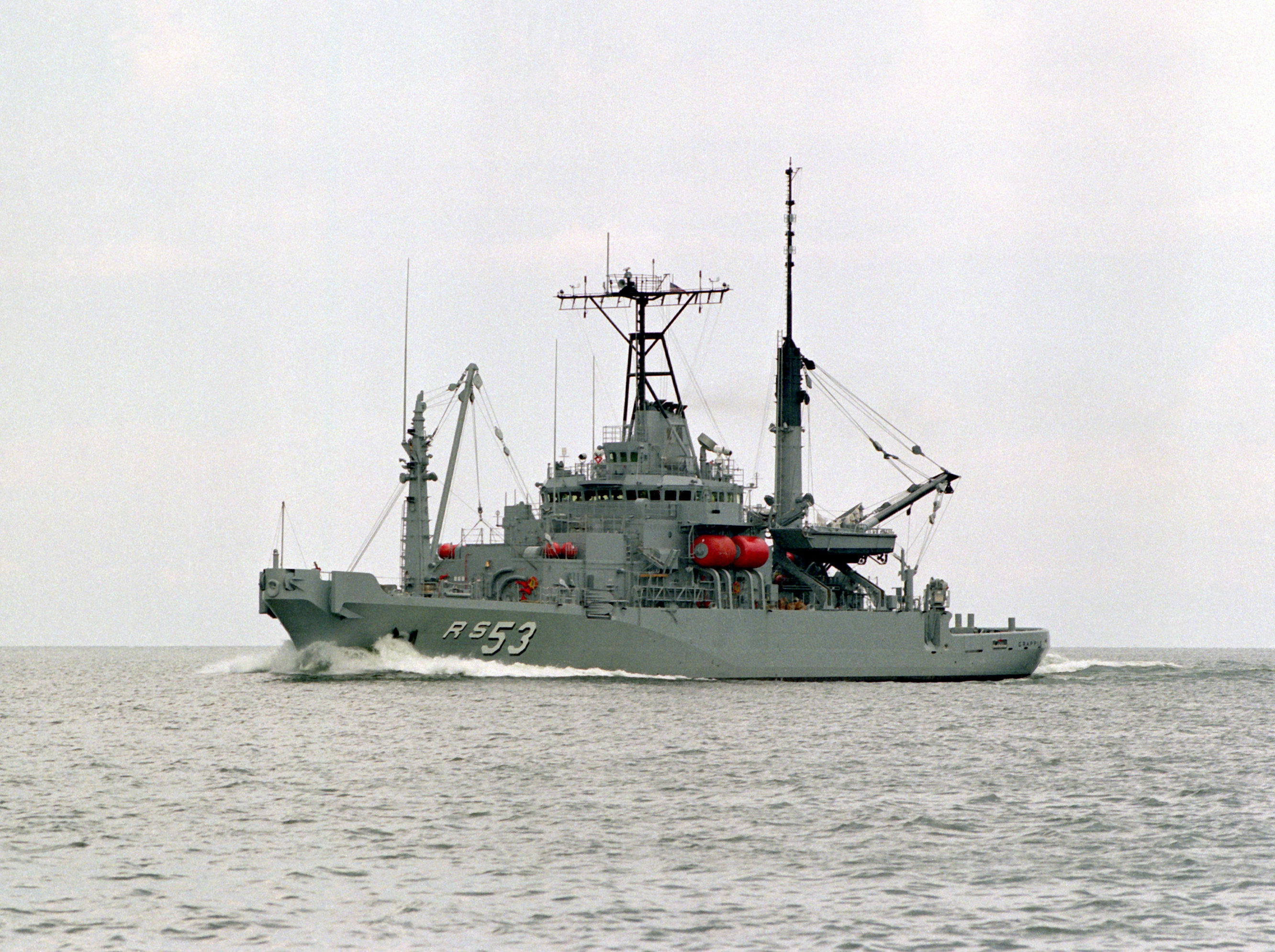
USNS Grapple, an example of a modern naval rescue salvage ship

Several navies have rescue and salvage vessels to support their fleet and serve distressed vehicles. In addition, they may have Deep Salvage Units. US Navy salvage facilities and operations are coordinated by the Supervisor of Salvage (SUPSALV), situated in Hawaii, Alaska, California, Virginia, Spain, Bahrain, Singapore, and Japan.

=== Plunder ===
When vessels are lost in an unknown area or are unprotected, a potential salvor might discover and plunder the wreck without knowledge of the wreck's owner. Salvaging a foreign navy's vessel is against international law. Despite this, many shipwrecks from World War II near Indonesia — where most of the water is shallower than 80 metres (260 ft)— are threatened by scavenging for low-background steel for use in medical and scientific equipment.

=== Intelligence salvage ===
During World War I, a Royal Navy team of covert divers led by GCC Damant salvaged intelligence materials from recently sunken U-boats. They mostly worked in the English Channel but extended as far as Scapa Flow. They dived and found at least fifteen wrecks, of which about seven provided valuable intelligence material.

At the height of the Cold War, the United States raised a portion of Soviet submarine K-129 in the Western Pacific Ocean. The CIA, who conducted the salvage under the guise of mining the seafloor for manganese nodules with a commercial vessel, spent over $800 million in 1974 on the clandestine operation now known as Project Azorian.

== Law ==
Salvage law states that a salvor should be rewarded for risking their life and property to rescue another ship in danger. It is in some ways similar to the wartime law of prize — the capture, condemnation and sale of a vessel and its cargo as a spoil of war, insofar as both compensate the salvor/captors for risking life and property. The two areas of law may overlap each other. For instance, a vessel taken as a prize, then recaptured by friendly forces on its way to the prize adjudication, is not deemed a prize of the rescuers (the title merely reverts to the original owner). However, the rescuing vessel is entitled to a claim for salvage. Likewise, a vessel found badly damaged, abandoned, and adrift after taking enemy fire, does not become a prize of a rescuing friendly vessel, but the rescuers may claim salvage. A vessel is considered in peril if it is in immediate danger or is likely within a reasonable and relevant period to become in danger. Prior to a salvage attempt, the salvor receives permission from the owner or the master to assist the vessel. If the vessel is abandoned, no permission is needed.

The reward is partly determined by the value of the vessel, the degree of risk, and the degree of peril the vessel was in. Legal disputes often arise from claiming salvage rights, so boat owners or skippers often remain on board and in command of the vessel; they do everything possible to minimise further loss and seek to minimise the degree of risk the vessel is in. If another vessel offers a tow and the master or owner negotiates an hourly rate before accepting, then salvage does not apply.

Some maritime rescue organisations, such as Britain's Royal National Lifeboat Institution advise that the crews of their lifeboats renounce their right to claim compensation for salvage, however if property is saved, they can make a claim but may need to pay for the use of the lifeboat and any damages that might occur.

Jetsam are goods thrown off a ship to eliminate any unnecessary weight. Flotsam are goods that floated away from the ship when it was sinking. Ligan or lagan are goods left in the sea, on the wreck, or tied to a buoy, so that they can be recovered later by the owners. Derelict is abandoned vessels or cargo.

The United Kingdom's Merchant Shipping Act 1995 states that jetsam, flotsam, lagan, and all other cargo in the wreckage remain the property of their original owners. Anyone removing those goods must inform the Receiver of Wreck to avoid the accusation of theft. Wreck diving has laws to protect historic wrecks of archaeological importance, and the Protection of Military Remains Act 1986 protects ships and aircraft that are the last resting place of the remains of members of the armed forces.

The 1910 Brussels Convention for the Unification of Certain Rules with Respect to Assistance and Salvage at Sea reflects the traditional legal principles of marine salvage. The 1989 International Convention on Salvage incorporated the essential provisions of the 1910 Convention while adding on new principles. The 1989 Salvage Convention entered force on 14 July 1996 with nearly twenty parties in agreement. States that are part of both conventions consider the 1989 Convention a greater priority over the 1910 one, where their provisions are mutually incompatible.

Boat owners can clarify with an assisting vessel if the operation is to be considered salvage, or simply assistance towing. If this is not done, the boat owner may find that the rescuer may be eligible for a substantial salvage award if the salvor can show sufficient evidence that the vessel was in peril at the time, and a lien may be placed on the vessel if it is unpaid. The salvor may then have a lawful right to keep the salvaged property until the claim is settled. The claim and award in law is influenced by the salved values involved, as well as the level of care, nature of rescue and efforts of the salvor. However, the salvage award can never exceed the salved value of the ship and property.

== Techniques ==
Marine salvage often requires the salvor to adapt available materials and equipment to the situation, and the job is often constrained by urgency, weather and sea conditions, site accessibility, and financial considerations.

Where practicable, procedures that minimise the use of divers are usually chosen, as diving is slow, strenuous, dangerous, expensive, and often inefficient. However, in some cases diving as the only way or may be the most efficient way to do the work. Diving operations are limited to conditions when the risk to the diving team is acceptable.

=== Disabled and abandoned vessels afloat ===
Rescue towing is when a ship in peril but still afloat is saved and taken to a refuge point. If the vessel is adrift at sea or near a shore or harbour, a connection must be made before the ship goes aground.

Salvage towing generally follows immediately after a salvage operation or may be a part of it. The salvaged vessel may be towed to a safe haven for temporary repairs, to a port or facility where complete repairs are possible, or to a disposal site for scrapping or sinking. Tow preparations may involve measures like reinforcing weakened parts of the ship, or special rigging to release the tow for sinking in a safe, controlled manner.

There is a major legal difference between assisting a vessel when a representative of the owner is on board— which requires their permission— and which may be considered salvage depending on the situation, and taking an abandoned vessel under tow, inherently considered salvage, which does not require permission.

=== Stranded and sunken ships ===
==== Surveys and planning ====
A salvage survey is done to get information on the state of the vessel and the site which will be useful for planning the salvage operation.

There is usually an initial or preliminary survey, followed by detailed surveys of topsides, interior, and underwater hull, and a hydrographic survey of the site, as applicable. A safety survey and risk assessment are part of these surveys, which are continuously updated as part of the operation as conditions change, and the operational plans are adapted to suit the changing circumstances.

==== Refloating ====
It is usually preferable to refloat a vessel so that it can be taken to a suitable venue for repair or scrapping, but this is not always reasonably practicable.

There are some basic aspects to refloating a stranded ship: Its position must be stabilised to avoid any further damage from the ground. Ground reactions must then be reduced to a level where the vessel can be moved off of the ground without any additional structural damage. Then the vessel is pulled off and moved into deeper water.

Stabilizing the vessel implies that it will not capsise due to insufficient static stability. This may require reducing free surfaces, lowering the centre of gravity, possibly restraining listing by pontoons fastened alongside to increase the waterplane area, or applying balancing forces.

==== Reduction of ground forces ====
Weight management increasing buoyancy, removing load bearing or obstructing ground, scouring, or lifting the ship by using machinery, are some of the ways to reduce ground reaction forces. (Note: ground reaction force: The force between a stranded vessel and the ground it rests on. It is the difference between the weight of the vessel and its buoyancy in the prevailing situation, and may cause friction resisting an attempt to tow it off.)

===== Weight management =====
Weight management is rearranging and distributing weight around the vessel. Weight removal nearby the ground reduces ground reaction, while removing weight farther away may increase ground reaction.

===== Buoyancy =====
Buoyancy can be increased by either pumping—if the compartment is not holed below the waterplane—or by blowing down compressed air if the compartment can be sealed above the waterplane. In some cases, there is a third method of discarding the water using buoyant materials.

===== Ground removal =====
Ground removal allows the ship to regain its buoyancy, provided there are no floods. Removing ground in a channel allows the vessel to float on water. However, this method of reducing ground forces depends on the condition of the ground. Sand and firm clay can be effortlessly removed but refill quickly, and the channel will be reasonably stable in the short term. If the vessel is resting on penetrating rocks, they must be removed even though it does not significantly reduce ground reaction.

===== Scouring =====
Scouring is clearing the ground by using flowing water. Currents may be produced by the propeller wash of tugs or jetting pumps, and is most effective in sand or mud. Dredging may be used to move large quantities of loose or soft material from around and under a vessel and dig channels for deep water. The equipment used for dredging depends on the seabed material and topography, access to the casualty, the situation of the casualty, and the dredging equipment available.

===== Heavy machinery =====
Ground reaction may also be reduced by physically lifting the ship. Methods used include jacking, pontoons, helicopters, and cranes or sheer legs.

Hydraulic jacks are used to temporarily lift stranded ships to allow them to be refloated by pulling or to permit slipways to be constructed under them. Jacking requires the seafloor to be hard enough to support the load, the ground to be reinforced, or the load spread on pads. Similarly, the hull of the ship must be protected from jacking forces. If these forces are not spread out along the hull, they may cause damage throughout the vessel. Jacks are placed near the center of the ground reaction, usually symmetrically, and are secured with a retrieving line led to the deck. The jacks are extended to their maximum lift at the beginning of a pull. When the ship moves, the jacks will topple and must be reset for the next pull. Jacks may also be used to push the ship horizontally if there is a suitable reaction surface.

Pontoons of any kind can be placed alongside the stranded ship and rigged either directly to the hull or with slings under the hull to provide lift and reduce ground reaction.

If space and water depths are adequate, cranes and sheer leg barges are rigged to lift the stranded ship to reduce the ground reaction.

Temporary reductions of ground forces can be made during pulling to reduce ground reaction, friction, or both. Jetting nozzles can be rigged to wash away the ground or to fluidise the seabed with injected water to reduce friction. A similar effect can be achieved by air lances inserted under the vessel. These are perforated pipes supplied with a high flow rate of compressed air. Swells increase the buoyancy of the vessel as they pass.

===== Patching and cofferdamming =====
Underwater patching is almost always done by divers. As much patch fabrication and rigging as possible is done out of the water to minimise diving time. Small leaks are generally sealed off and made watertight by wooden plugs and wedges, small wooden patches and concrete boxes, small steel plate patches or combinations of these, caulked and sometimes additionally sealed with epoxy resin or fibre-reinforced resins. Small steel patches for minor leaks are usually fitted with gasket material to seal against the damaged hull. Major patching is characterised by extensive diving work and includes detailed underwater surveys, measurements, and major underwater cutting and welding operations to prepare and fit the patches.

When all or part of the main deck of a sunken ship is submerged, flooded spaces cannot be dewatered until all openings are sealed or the effective freeboard is extended above the high water level. In salvage, one method of doing this is to build a temporary watertight extension of the entire hull of the ship, or the space to be dewatered, to the surface. This watertight extension is a cofferdam.

Although they are temporary structures, cofferdams have to be strongly built, heavily stiffened, and reinforced to withstand the hydrostatic and other loads that they will have to withstand. Large cofferdams are normally restricted to harbour operations.

Complete cofferdams cover most or all of the sunken vessel and are equivalent to extensions of the ship's sides to above the water surface.

Partial cofferdams are constructed around moderate-sized openings or areas such as a cargo hatch or small deckhouse. They can often be prefabricated and installed as a unit, or prefabricated panels can be joined during erection. When partial cofferdams are used, it may be necessary to compensate for hydrostatic pressure on the deck by shoring the decks. With both complete and partial cofferdams, there is usually a large free surface in the spaces being pumped. Sometimes this can be limited by dewatering one compartment at a time, or by groups.

Small cofferdams are used for pumping or to allow salvors access to spaces that are covered by water at some stage of the tide. They are usually prefabricated and fitted around minor openings.

Diving work on cofferdams often involves clearing obstructions, fitting, and fastening, including underwater welding, and where necessary, caulking, bracing and shoring the adjacent structure.

===== Dewatering =====
Removal of water from flooded parts of the vessel is done to increase buoyancy by removing weight. The effect on stability is variable depending on the free surface in each compartment, and the effect on the position of the centre of gravity. Dewatering may be done by pumping the water out and allowing atmospheric pressure air to replace it through vents, in which case the external hydrostatic pressure loads may require shoring and bracing, or by sealing the compartment and blowing out the water using compressed air, which puts internal pressure loads on the structure which depend on the pressure needed to expel the water.

====== Salvage pumps ======
Salvage pumps are general-purpose, portable dewatering pumps adapted for marine salvage work. They tend to be of rugged construction with a protective framework or packaging to reduce the risk of accidental damage.

Other features include the ability to self-prime and to handle a wide range of fluid viscosities and specific gravities.

Pump types that are widely used in marine salvage work include self-contained, heavy-duty, internal combustion engine driven centrifugal pumps, pneumatic diaphragm and centrifugal pumps, and eductors and air lifts, which are dynamic pumps that use air or water to move other fluids. They are simple, rugged and versatile, and are widely used in salvage operations.

===== Pulling systems =====
Tugs and ground tackle are commonly used in salvage. Tugs are attached to the vessel by a towline, and develop pulling forces with their engines and propellers. Salvage ground tackle is a system of anchors, ground legs, (Note: ground leg: The mooring assembly between the ground to which it is anchored, and the hauling gear.) and hauling gear (Note: hauling gear: The equipment which takes up the slack and exerts tension in the ground tackle.) rigged to pullers, purchases, (Note: purchase: A system of cables and sheave blocks rigged to provide a mechanical advantage.) or winches, on a platform, which may be the stranded ship, a salvage ship, a barge, or the shore. The total pulling force may be developed by a combination of ground tackle and tugs.

===== Salvage rigging and lifting =====
Most salvage operations involve some form of lifting, from handling materials and equipment to lifting whole ships from the seabed. External lifting is often a practical alternative to recovering buoyancy, and has some advantages in that it reduces the complex underwater work of making the vessel watertight, which usually requires less preparation time at depth and inside a sunk vessel.

External lifting involves lifting units that can be synchronized to achieve the desired lift throughout the operation; it can provide more transverse and longitudinal stability compared to recovery of buoyancy, and is usually quicker.

There are three categories of external lifts: immersed buoyant lifts, tidal lifts and mechanical lifts.

Inflatable lift bags and rigid steel pontoons have been consistently useful as submersible buoyant lifting devices for salvage work.

Tidal lifts mainly use the rise of tide to provide the range of motion of the lift, but some additional lifting capacity is available by de-ballasting the lift craft. The lift craft are often barges, which may be adapted from vessels locally available. The method is not often used and relies on a suitable tidal range. The lift craft are usually used in pairs with the sunken vessel slung between them, but a single vessel straddling the sunken vessel can be used for a limited range of lifting until the water depth gets too shallow for the lifting vessel to fit above the casualty. A single large lifting vessel may be appropriate to do the initial lift and move the casualty into more sheltered water, where the lift can be completed by several less seaworthy barges, and where relative movement can be more easily controlled.

Mechanical lifts use wire ropes chain rigged to, or under, the sunken object. They are independent of tide, but tides could be used for assisting the lift, and there is more control of the lift and lifting rates. Lifts may be possible in heavier sea conditions than possible for tidal lifts.

The following types of mechanical lifts are made in salvage:

- Bow and stern lifts by salvage ships
- Lifts by crane vessels with slewing cranes
- Bow lifts by sheer-leg barges
- When close enough to the shore, land based lifting equipment may be used when available.

==== Wrecking in place ====
Wrecking in place, or piecemeal demolition, is dismantling a wreck in situ (on site), usually when it is not possible or economically viable to salvage it, and it is a navigational hazard. Removal and disposal of the ship's contents, such as cargo, stores, and equipment may be included.

The usual methods for wrecking in place are manual flame cutting by divers and surface workers, mechanical demolition using heavy lift cranes, explosive sectioning, dispersal, or flattening, and burial or settling by hydraulic dredging.

=== Capsized ships ===
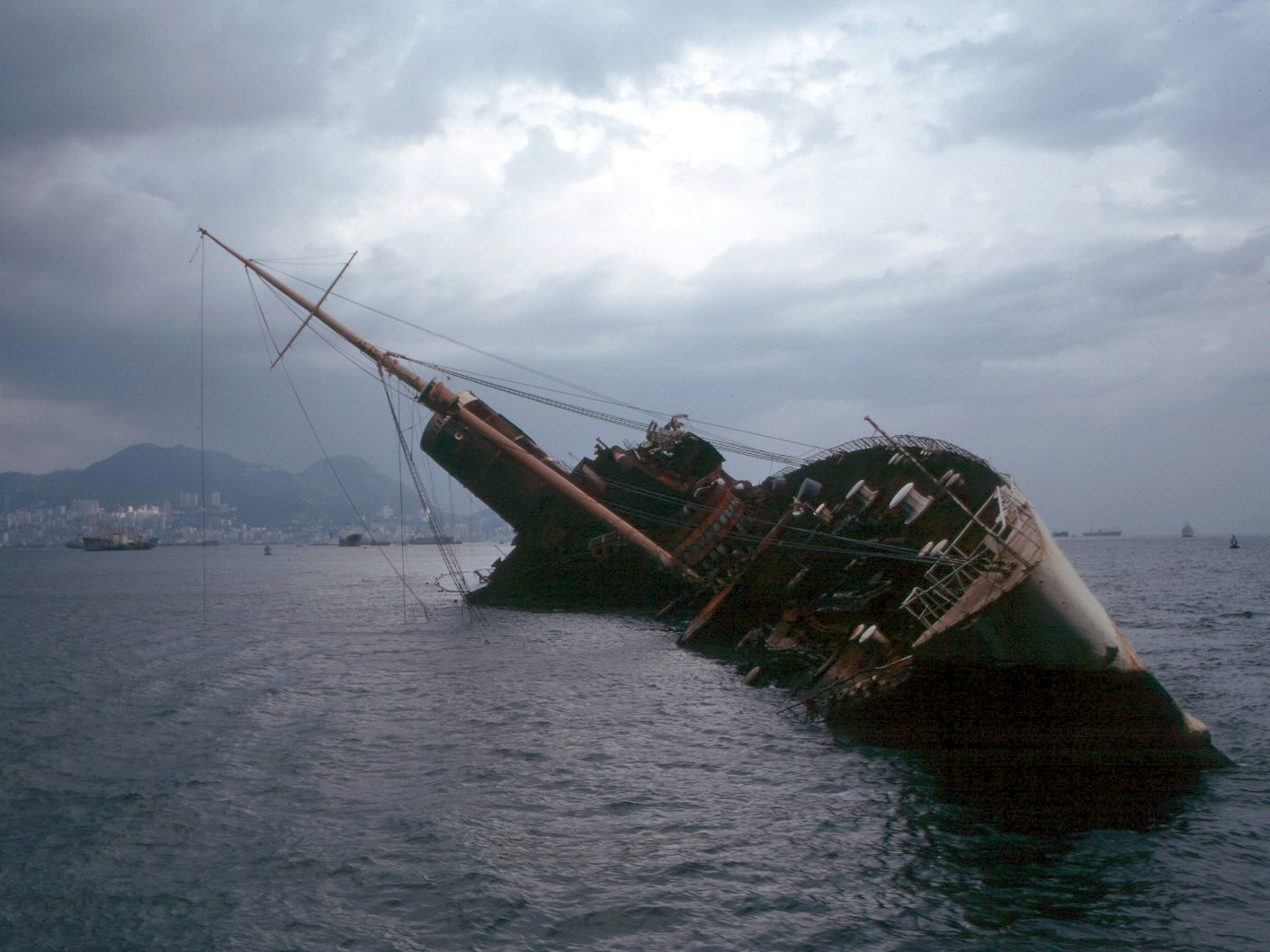
Seawise University capsized after being gutted by fire in 1972

Capsising occurs when a boat or ship is tipped over beyond the angle of positive static stability. It may result from broaching, knockdown, or loss of stability due to cargo shifting or flooding. In high speed boats, capsizing is a result of sharp turns. A capsized vessel may sink or remain afloat, and a sinking vessel may roll over while sinking. The process of recovering a vessel from a capsise is called righting.

The salvage of a capsized vessel may involve righting on site, or towing to a more sheltered area before righting; possibly including refloating, either before or after righting.

It is not unusual for a ship to capsise as it sinks, as refloating becomes more difficult. Ships are righted by applying a moment to overcome the forces holding the ship in the capsized position. There are four basic approaches to salvaging a capsized ship:

- Righting the ship in place, and then refloating it
- Refloating the ship on its side and moving it to another location to be righted
- Rotating the ship until it is completely upside down and refloating the inverted ship
- Wrecking the ship in situ

Factors influencing how a ship is righted may include:

- How much of a hazard to navigation the vessel is
- Whether the cargo and fuel are environmental hazards
- Where the vessel is
- The weather and climate of the vessel's area
- Logistical resources
- Structural condition of the vessel
- Value of the vessel and its contents
- Condition and position of the vessel

The position and attitude of a capsized vessel in the water relative to the geography has a strong influence of the complexity and preferred method of righting and refloating it, including:

- The angle of the vessel's rotation
- The depth of water around and over the ship
- The type of seabed and the contact area and distribution of the plating in contact with the seabed, and how much the ship is embedded in the bottom
- Slope of the bottom and amount of trim
- Proximity to fixed installations, such as piers, wharves, or harbour installations
- Distance to sheltered or protected shallow water areas

==== Environmental effects ====
Environmental effects that influence the salvage of capsized ships include:

- Embedding into the bottom sediments, and the associated suction effects that increase forces required to break the vessel out of the bottom at the start of righting or lifting
- Scouring of the bottom sediments immediately adjacent to the vessel, which removes sediment supporting the ship and can cause high structural loads, which can lead to structural failure of the hull, and further subsidence into the seabed
- Silt deposition inside the hull that increases weight within the vessel or necessitates removal before lifting or righting
- Slope of the bottom, which influences the position and attitude of the vessel on the bottom
- Tidal currents and depth variations which can complicate or assist with refloating, and waves and surge which affect the work of divers, and salvage vessels. Underwater visibility also affects the efficiency of diving work

==== Righting in place, then refloating ====
Righting a capsized ship is usually done to remove a ship that is obstructing a berth, harbour area, or access channel, although wrecks are also salvaged for environmental or aesthetic reasons.

There is no guarantee that a righted and refloated ship can be economically returned to service. The combined costs of righting, refloating, repairing, and refurbishing usually make returning the ship to service financially impractical. Most righting operations involve the removal of large amounts of superstructure, adding to the cost of repairs.

The method, or combination of methods, to be used to right a capsized ship, depend on several factors, including:

- Calculation of the righting moments needed to overcome the capsizing moments
- Identification of the physical point about which the ship will rotate, which may involve substrate load-bearing and shear calculations
- Investigation of local hull stresses in the ship during righting
- Determination of load-bearing capacity of hull areas critical to righting
- Transverse and longitudinal stability analysis at selected stages of the righting process, and if necessary hull shear and bending moment analyses at these stages
- Available options for weight reduction, buoyancy addition, and other methods to reduce righting forces or lower the capsizing moment will be investigated

Several methods may be used for righting capsized ships. Most involve rotating the vessel around the turn of the bilge as the contact area with the seabed, known as static righting. However, there are circumstances when this is not practical. Different criteria apply if the ship is refloated while capsized and then righted while floating.

- Selective sealing of major compartments in the hull, with controlled dewatering by pumping to restore buoyancy, combined with ballasting the high side to provide a righting couple
- Inducing buoyancy into selected spaces by displacing water with compressed air, and adding high side water ballast to provide a couple. It may be necessary to provide some external force to start the rotation
- Applying external static forces to lever arms mounted on the hull, usually in combination with dewatering some compartments
- Applying external counterweights to the high side of the hull, and external buoyant lifting systems to the low side
- Applying a direct, external lifting force to the low side of the hull
- Extending lever arms, known as headframes, from the hull and applying external righting forces at the end of these levers
- Applying a combination of direct lift to the low side of the hull, and an external pull to the high side of the hull, used when sufficient hauling and lifting power is readily available and is not practical to seal the hull for induced buoyancy.
- Fixing righting beams to the high side of the capsized ship, then applying a lifting force to these levers
- A combination of methods, including restoring buoyancy by dewatering selected spaces, adding rotational ballast to the high side, applying a dynamic pull to the high side of the ship, and a mechanical lift on the low side
- Dredging or scouring sedimentary bottom ground out along the bilges to undercut the side resting on the bottom.

Once the ship has been righted, appropriate methods for refloating may be applied if necessary, and further dewatering and ballasting may be used to achieve satisfactory stability for transit.

==== Refloating while lying on the side ====
When a vessel is lying on its side, it is sealed to allow dewatering by compressing air, pumping out, inducing buoyancy, applying enough direct lifting power to lift the ship bodily while on its side, or any combination of these methods.

The transverse and longitudinal static stability of a ship to be refloated on its side must be calculated for during and after the refloating, and precautions taken to ensure that unplanned changes of orientation do not occur.

A ship refloated on its side can then be towed to a place more suitable for righting if this is useful. This type of operation may require setting up hauling equipment on shore, preparing the ship for righting by fitting attachment points for lifting and hauling gear, removing top-weight that increases capsizing moment, and sealing openings that would allow air to escape from buoyant compartments during righting.

==== Refloating while upside down ====
Refloating an upside-down ship may be appropriate when:

- It is capsized to more than ninety degrees.
- The ship's bottom is relatively intact or can be made airtight.
- Items that will increase the navigational draft of the inverted ship can be removed easily, or do not matter.
- The route to the destination is deep enough to allow the inverted ship to pass.
- The refloated ship is to be scuttled in deep water, scrapped in a dry-dock, or taken to some other place that can accept the inverted ship.

Ships are usually refloated upside down by restoring their buoyancy with compressed air so that the ship's bottom plating can be made airtight with minimal work. Rotation to the completely inverted position usually is done by a combination of inducing buoyancy by blowing down hull compartments with compressed air and applying a relatively small amount of external buoyancy or direct lift to rotate the vessel to the inverted position. Transverse and longitudinal stability must be calculated to ensure floating stability. An upside-down ship is usually adequately stable when the waterline is around tank-top level, or about a meter freeboard for moderate to large ships without a double bottom.

Air that leaks from inverted ships under tow or standing for long periods while upside down is replenished or the ship will sink again when sufficient buoyancy is lost.

=== Minimizing disruption to shipping ===
Ships that capsise or sink in navigable waterways are traffic hazards. Depending on the situation, traffic may be restricted or impossible, and refloating the ship in its existing orientation may allow the lanes to be cleared with minimum delay.

When there is no operational necessity for salvors to obstruct channel traffic, it is preferable to allow normal traffic for as long as reasonably possible. Safe navigational practice may require local traffic to be restricted or stopped during parts of the operation.

=== Salvage firefighting ===
Shipboard firefighting and associated damage control can be considered salvage work when done as assistance to a vessel in distress, and is done in three basic phases.

- Containment of fire within structural boundaries to prevent it spreading.
- Control of fires inside the imposed boundaries, and securing adjacent areas from the threat of fire.
- Extinguishing fires by systematic attacks by firefighting teams moving through the fire control boundaries and attacking the fire fronts.

There are also two associated, but subsidiary, phases:

- Control of flooding by preventing the accumulation of firefighting water and limiting or mitigating the damage it can cause to structure, buoyancy, stability, equipment, and cargo, that directly threaten survival of the ship.
- Cleaning and repairing damaged areas, patching, and dewatering.

=== Deep water salvage ===
An entire ship can be recovered from deep water when economically viable in some special cases, or because it is easier to recover the whole vessel intact than to try to recover the targeted items on their own. Deep ocean salvage operations may be done to recover material which may:

- be useful in an investigation to determine cause of a casualty,
- be usefully returned to service,
- be hazardous to the environment if left in place,
- prevent it from falling into hostile hands,
- have sufficient intrinsic value to justify the cost.

Deep salvage operations tend to be slow and tedious, and often require more precision than other types of salvage operations.

Since the second half of the 20th century, developments in technology led to machinery being capable of locating small objects on the seafloor and allowing recovery of objects from far deeper than divers can work. The development of towed side-scan sonar and similar technology has improved the probability of successful deep searches. Dragging with grapnels, searches by divers, and searches using low-resolution sonar were previously the tools available for ocean search. Such searches were difficult, limited in depth and had a very low probability of success.

==== Underwater searches ====
Underwater searches are a basic aspect of deep water salvage operations, as before an object can be recovered, it must first be found, inspected and identified, and recorded so that it can be returned to when necessary.

The main factors of a search operation are:

- whether there are acoustic pingers, transponders or other location aids on the target.
- datum quality – the accuracy and reliability of the existing position information,
- target characteristics (size, material and breakup characteristics),
- water depth and other characteristics,
- seafloor type and topography,
- prevailing weather conditions,
- geographical location,
- equipment availability.

===== Sensor types =====
====== Echo sounders ======
Single and multi-beam echo sounders are types of sonar that can measure and record the bottom profile along the track of the search platform. Single beam echo sounders are permanently installed on a ship, with the transducers mounted through the hull. Multi-beam systems are also permanent and mounted through the hull, portable and mounted over the side, or towed. Resolution depends on the signal frequency and height of the transducers above the bottom, and depth range depends to some extent on frequency. Accuracy depends on the positional data for the transducers and corrections made for the actual speed of sound through the water during the search.

====== Side-scan sonar ======
Side-scan sonar uses acoustic transducers towed underwater to produce a plan view image of the seafloor showing details of the topography and artifacts at the sides of the track. The swath of seafloor covered in a single pass by side-scan sonar is relatively wide; therefore, it is a relatively efficient search system with a high proficiency of detecting a target.

The effective resolution of side-scan sonar depends largely on the operating frequency; the higher the frequency, the greater the resolution, but swath width coverage is inversely related to frequency, so that the higher the frequency, the smaller the area of seafloor covered in a single pass. Sonar images indicate surfaces, which reflect the signal. Anything entirely in the shadow of another object will not be detected.

====== Pinger locators ======
Pinger locators are a class of passive acoustic search systems that do not produce any sound—they only detect sound within a specific frequency range. They are useful for finding artifacts equipped with an acoustic beacon (pinger) as a signal of the vehicle's location, such as cockpit voice recorders and flight data recorders used by nearly all military and commercial aircraft, which have a 37 kHz acoustic pinger to help locate them in case of a crash at sea.

Pinger-locators that use an omnidirectional hydrophone have a maximum detection range of about one nautical mile (about 1,850 meters). The omnidirectional hydrophone cannot give bearing information, so several passes must be made over the pinger to pinpoint its position. A pinger-locator that uses a tuned array with a narrow directional hydrophone can give directional information and has increased detection range of up to about two nautical miles. Towed pinger-locators (TPLS) are towed through the search area much like a side-scan sonar, but can be towed at a higher speed as there are no concerns about resolution. Because of their long range and higher speed, they tend to be effective at locating the target in a shorter time. Pinger-locators designed for hand-held operations from the surface or by divers, have a shorter range.

====== Magnetometers ======
Magnetometers are sensitive to electromagnetic fields that differ from the local geomagnetic field. In most applications relating to salvage, this is a fairly large mass of steel or iron. They have a relatively limited detection range, as the target is not usually strongly magnetised, and can also pick up volcanic rock if present in large amounts.

The magnetic signal strength of an object is inversely proportional to the cube of the distance between the sensor and the object, so magnetometers are less commonly used than the primary sensor, but magnetometers are sometimes used as a secondary sensor to a side-scan sonar search, particularly in situations where the target is lost within misleading terrain, such as a field of rocks, and the sonar return from the target is not easily distinguished from those of the rocks. A magnetometer is also one of the few instruments capable of locating an object that is buried deeply in bottom sediments.

====== Optical imaging systems ======
Optical imaging systems have been successfully used in deep ocean searches, either independently or in combination with a side-scan sonar. The obvious advantage of an optical imaging system is that the image produced can result in identification of the target without the need for time-consuming contact classification. The actual sensing devices used in optical imaging include still photographic cameras, real-time video cameras, and laser-imaging systems, using lidar technology. Still and video cameras rely on conventional strobe or floodlights as their illumination source. Due to limitations imposed by attenuation of the light and backscattering, still and video sensors need to be within 10 to 20 meters of a target to identify it. A laser-imaging system utilises a blue and green laser as the illumination source to minimise attenuation and backscattering problems and can image targets as far as 50 meters away in good conditions. The disadvantages of these systems are a result of high sensitivity to turbidity and underwater visibility and include a relatively very narrow swath width and range compared to sonar, which results in relatively low towfish altitudes and a low search rate.

===== Sensor platforms =====
====== Surface vessels ======
Surface vessels can search underwater using sonar and magnetometer detection equipment. Sometimes, an optical search is also possible. Sensors and sensor arrays can be mounted on surface vessels, either in a fixed mounting, or on a mounting that is deployed when in use and may be portable between vessels allowing convenient and economical use from vessels of opportunity. Some types of sensors, such as side-scan sonar and magnetometers, deployed near the bottom work better, so salvors deploy them as towed array sonar systems on towfish, towed behind a surface vessel, with the display and recording equipment on the towing vessel.

====== Towfish ======
A towed array sonar, or towfish, is a system of hydrophones towed behind a ship by a cable. Trailing the hydrophones behind the vessel on a cable that can be kilometers long keeps the array's sensors away from the ship's own noise sources, greatly improving its signal-to-noise ratio, and hence the effectiveness of detecting and tracking faint contacts, such as quiet, low noise-emitting submarine threats, or seismic signals.

====== Remotely operated vehicles ======
A remotely operated vehicle (ROV) can be used as a platform for sensors, which can maneuver the sensors in proximity to objects of interest on the bottom. Its value as a search tool depends on how effectively and efficiently it can be used to cover a search area compared to towed or surface vessel mounted systems. An ROV is limited to operating in small areas because of the restriction of the umbilical on maneuverability and range, but it is effective in searching a debris field for specific items. Onboard acoustic and optical sensors can be used to locate and identify objects, and manipulators may be useful for recovering objects within its carrying capacity.

====== Crewed submersibles ======
Crewed submersibles often have search sensors mounted as part of their basic outfit, as searches are a common task, and the same sensors are often also used for underwater navigation.

====== Autonomous underwater vehicles ======
An autonomous underwater vehicle (AUV) is a robotic submersible that travels underwater without requiring continuous input from an operator. AUVs are part of a larger class of undersea systems known as unmanned underwater vehicles, which includes remotely operated underwater vehicles (ROVs) – controlled and powered from the surface by an operator via an umbilical. Some AUVs are capable of deep ocean, large area side-scan sonar search and detailed optical inspection interchangeably.

===== Other search tools =====
====== Navigation systems ======
Accurate and repeatable navigation is an essential requirement for deep ocean search operations. The salvor must have the ability to steer the vessel on the planned search pattern, precisely track the position of the search vessel and sensor towfish, and return to any position at a later time.

====== Loss data analysis ======
Loss data analysis is the process of defining the search area and most probable target location by the acquisition and analysis of all available information related to the loss of an object. This task is the start of the planning process and will usually influence the other planning activities, such as equipment selection and search pattern design. The first step is to compile all of the information available from the actual scene of the loss. This may require a first-hand visit to the scene by the search specialist to interview eyewitnesses as soon as possible, due to information expiring over a long period of time. The following information is usually collected:

- Times of the loss and other related events.
- Eyewitness and survivor accounts describing the loss.
- Position of the loss or last contact with the object.
- Position of floating debris.
- Position of survivor rescues.
- Weather conditions at the time of loss.
- Water conditions at the time of loss.

All information and its sources are analyzed for probable accuracy. Some data will be contradictory and a judgement will have to be made regarding the probability of accuracy of each. The search area box around the most probable seafloor position must account for the cumulative error or the uncertainty inherent in the deduced position. The confidence level that the target lies within the search box should be high before the actual search commences.

====== Search probability analysis ======
Search probability analysis takes the loss data analysis further by determining the most probable target location. The search area box is partitioned into smaller areas called cells, each individually assigned its own calculated probability of the target being in that cell. A map of these cells will indicate where the search should be concentrated to improve the chance of early location of the target in a large search area.

===== Search patterns =====
The quality of a search pattern is measured by how thoroughly and efficiently the search area is examined. Systematic examination of the search area is achieved by following a planned pattern that is suitable to the search's parameters.

There are search patterns which have been found to be both effective and practical for deep ocean searches. For side-scan sonar searches, regardless of what search pattern is used, is to orient the long dimension of the search area so that it is approximately parallel with the depth contours, which minimises the need to make changes of the towfish altitude to maintain a reasonably consistent altitude and swath width; this results in more consistent sonar performance and a lower risk of omitted areas and excessive swath overlap. Signal degradation may occur on the down-slope side when running along contours, but is preferable to poor returns from the towfish as it is hauled up and down. Track spacing can be adapted to compensate.

====== Parallel grid search ======
The most commonly used search pattern for a towed sensor search is a rectangular grid with straight-line search tracks parallel to each other. Adjacent search tracks are spaced close enough to allow the sonar coverage to overlap by enough to compensate for ship track and sonar tow path variations, and also compensate for the inherent loss in the sonar return and resolution at the outer edges and caused by depth variations.

The ship must reverse heading and steady its course with the towfish aligned and at the correct depth at the end of each line and before re-entering the search area. A towfish will tend to change depth with a change in speed, and care must be taken that it does not hit the bottom during the turns. A straight run of several kilometers may be needed to get the towfish properly realigned in deep water work, so the time required for turns may exceed the time actually searching.

====== Constant range search ======
Constant range searches are used if the vessel's navigation system is unable to navigate along straight lines. This pattern uses search lines that are a constant distance from a fixed reference point. When used for a side-scan sonar search, the range from the central point of the curves must be great enough to give a reasonably straight-line segment, as tracks that are not straight will degrade the side-scan sonar imagery and make interpretation much more difficult. With ubiquitous GPS, this method is mostly of historical interest.

====== "Z" search ======
"Z" search patterns are used specifically for the location of an undersea pipeline or cable, and they essentially cover the entire search area with slightly less detection probability than a parallel grid search, but without the need for 100-percent coverage and the typical overlap. The "Z" search makes use of the linear nature of pipelines and cables by ensuring that the towed sensor will cross the object several times at a reasonable angle for detection. If the object is detected with high confidence on the first few passes, the pattern can be modified such that the track lines will be shortened to just span the object and eventually follow it continuously within sensor range. The primary disadvantages of a "Z" search are that the object's orientation must be known beforehand and that the actual moment of detection is short and can be missed. For this reason, it is recommended that both a side-scan sonar and magnetometer be used in tandem.

====== ROV box search ======
An ROV box search is unique to ROV operations. The ROV will completely search a square area of seafloor and then move on to search an adjacent square area of the same dimensions. Through successive searching of adjacent boxes arranged in a grid, the ROV can systematically cover a search area with reasonable expectations of full coverage. ROV box searches are designed around the effective range of the ROV's scanning sonar and the scope of free movement available to the ROV using its tether. The search begins by deploying the ROV in the center of the box while the support ship keeps station over the box center. Guided by the sonar contacts it picks up, the ROV follows radial lines from the center of the box to locate and visually inspect each contact.

===== Search coverage =====
Search coverage is the area of seafloor effectively inspected by the sensors. Its area is determined by the sensor effective swath width and the distance traveled by the search vessel on its track. It also relates to the repeat coverage of an area—one pass ideally gives 100% coverage of an area and two passes over the same area gives 200% for that area. The quality of a search depends on how well the search area is examined. Occasionally, a cursory search may find an object, but a thorough search is always to be planned and the search area is completely covered.

Swath width is the lateral coverage of the seafloor by the search sensor perpendicular to the track. It is based on the detection range for the target for the expected bottom terrain. Resolution of the sensor is inversely related to swath width, particularly for side-scan sonar—the greater the swath width the lower the resolution. Swath width is also a function of sensor height and bottom slope, and will vary depending on bottom profile.

Lane spacing is the distance between two adjacent tracks in a grid search. The lane spacing must be less than the swath width of the sensor to allow for enough range overlap to assure complete coverage of the search area. The spacing between tracks along with the swath width determines the degree of coverage of the search area and ultimately the quality of the search. As lane spacing is decreased, the coverage and search quality increases because a greater percentage of seafloor is examined in two separate sensor passes. Closer lane spacing gives more thorough coverage, but increases the search time because more passes must be made through a given search area.

Range overlap is the area of seafloor that is examined twice on successive passes. It provides a margin of safety to mitigate ship track and sensor tow path variations and compensates for the inherent loss in the sonar signal quality at the outer ranges. The amount of range overlap required should be estimated before starting the search. A common range overlap for side-scan sonar is 50%, which is produced by using a lane spacing that of 50% of the swath width. The entire area of seafloor between the two outer tracks of the search box should be scanned twice in this scenario.

Search time is the time expended on the search, and is estimated during the planning. The basic information used for the calculation is the size of the area to be searched, the lane spacing to be used during the search, the approximate speed of the search vessel and an estimate of the end-of-line turn time, taking into account the water depth.

Contact classification is the process in which contacts from sensors are analyzed. Classification is a process of interpretation which depends on the distinctive characteristics target as the reference against which contacts are compared. It may be possible to identify a contact to be the lost object without the need for in-depth analysis, but in complex searches that involve many objects and numerous false contacts, the classification process can take days or weeks. Quantitative analysis that can be performed on side-scan and multibeam sonar contacts includes measuring the intensity of sonar signal returned by the contact, measuring the horizontal dimensions of the target and the height of the contact off the seafloor. Precise position data of the contacts can also be useful in the interpretation of data. Qualitative analysis of a contact is the interpretation by the search specialist based on experience. The product of this analysis is a list of contacts ranked in priority for subsequent observation and identification.

==== Recovery systems ====
The recovery systems available for deep salvage operations include ambient pressure divers, manned submersibles, atmospheric diving systems, remotely operated vehicles, and surface-controlled grabbing devices. The system selected for a particular operation depends upon availability, operational feasibility and economics. Every time an operator submerges to any depth, the risk to life in the operation increases. ROVs have become the primary tool of choice for many deep ocean operations.

Divers bring human vision, judgement, and dexterity to recovery operations, but these advantages are outweighed by the increasing complexity and cost of ambient pressure diving operations as depth increases, and there are physiological limits which set a maximum practical depth of around 300 metres (0.19 mi), even for saturation diving. There are also environmental limitations of current and visibility, particularly when target identification and complex rigging tasks are involved. There are complex logistics and dedicated personnel requirements for diving operations at all depths, and this is increased for saturation diving.

Ambient pressure diving only gives access to shallow depths relative to those attainable by atmospheric diving systems, submersibles, and ROVs. Divers are most effectively employed in relatively shallow water when the hazards of the operation and the decompression requirements are limited.

Crewed submersibles and atmospheric diving systems can take human operators deeper than ambient pressure diving, incur no decompression obligation, and reduce the risk of drowning and other environmental hazards. These systems are useful in operations where it helps to have an operator who can view the target directly and can reason on the bottom. Crewed vehicles can operate without tethers, which can severely limit the maneuverability of tethered vehicles (ROVs), particularly in high-current areas.

Remotely Operated Vehicles (ROVs) can be used for most deep ocean salvage operations. These vehicles are available in a range of capabilities, allowing the use of equipment best suited to the task. ROVs eliminate the risk to human life inherent in crewed systems, and are capable of operating at depth until the task is complete or maintenance is required; operator fatigue does not limit mission duration which is particularly advantageous where the depth requires long ascent and descent times.

===== Lifting =====
For very small loads, it may be possible and convenient to recover the load using the ROV or submersible directly. For larger loads, buoyant lifts, cable lifts and combined buoyancy, assisted cable lifts are used.

The lifting load has several components. If the load is embedded in the bottom, the breakout force can be a large part of the total, even the largest part in some situations. This can be difficult to manage with purely buoyant lifts; if one breaks, the lifting force from an unconstrained buoyant lifting device may cause an uncontrolled ascent, in which hydrodynamic drag is the limiting factor to ascent speed. To keep control, a tripping line may be attached to a lift bag, which will spill the air from the lift bag after it breaks out the load and ascends a few metres. An alternative is to use a lift bag which has less buoyancy than the weight of the load in water, and use a lifting cable to provide the rest of the breakout and lift force, ensuring that the load ascends at the rate the cable is reeled in.

The object to be recovered has a weight in water, also known as apparent weight or negative buoyancy, which is its dry weight less its displacement and the weight that caused the ship to sink. If it is hollow and flooded, there is the inertia of the internal water which increases the force needed to accelerate the object. If it is not self draining, this is added to the object's basic air weight when lifting it out of the water. Additional water will be entrained when it is moving, and increase the inertial mass when accelerating during the lift. This is a difficult load to calculate, as it depends on orientation, shape and speed of movement. It may also be considered as hydrodynamic drag. It has a damping effect on acceleration and speed of lift, and disappears when the load is standing still or when it is lifted out of the water.

Another part of the load is the self weight of the cable. This can be a large part of the load for deep work with steel cable due to the density of steel, but is much less of a problem with high specific strength synthetic cables, which can be nearly neutral buoyancy.

The static load is the load when hanging free and motionless in the water, a theoretical situation which may occur for brief intervals, and is less than the dynamic loads peaks due to velocity and acceleration. Much of the dynamic loading is caused by ship motion in a seaway, and can be reduced by using a cable that stretches when the load increases and returns to a shorter state when the lifting cable load is reduced. Another way of limiting dynamic load is to pass the cable through a ship motion compensator, also known as a heave compensator, which adjusts the deployed cable length to reduce dynamic loading. This may be a passive system, which acts like a spring and damper, or an active system, which adjusts the speed and direction of the winch to similar, but usually a greater effect.

Although elasticity of the lifting cable can dissipate shock loads, it makes the cable and load system subject to resonance at some frequency which depends on the mass of the load and the length and elasticity of the cable. The velocity dependent drag of the water on the load works to damp oscillation, but there will usually be a depth at which the natural frequency of vertical oscillation of the load and cable matches the frequency of seaway induced disturbances on the position of the lifting point and resonant motion occurs. This is a dangerous stage of the lift, as the resonance can increase cable tension considerably, so the time in resonance should be minimised. Heave compensators can reduce resonant motion considerably, and an increase of hoist speed will increase drag on the load and may also help damp oscillations.

== History ==
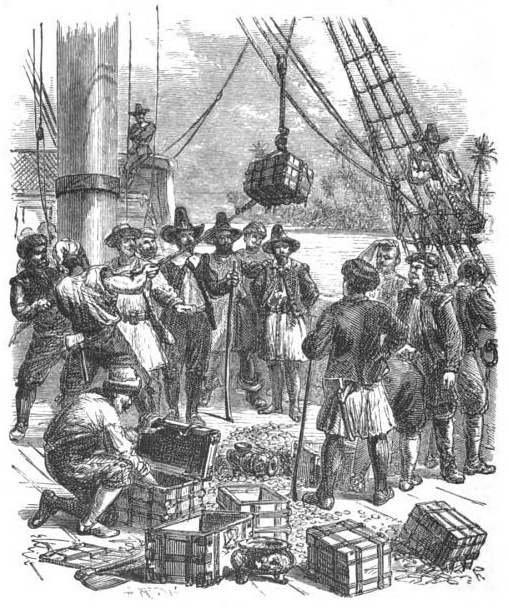
Sir William Phipps used a diving bell to salvage cargo from a sunken Spanish treasure ship.

The recovery of cargo from ships sunk in shallow coastal waters by breathhold divers and by dragging with grapnels is recorded in classical antiquity.

=== 16th to 18th centuries ===
The large growth in maritime traffic in the Atlantic between the 1500s and 1800s was accompanied by a large number of shipwrecks, many with valuable cargoes. In response to this, a corresponding growth occurred in the salvage industry. Most divers of the period were employed in harvesting natural resources and in salvage work. The earliest salvors were mainly opportunistic, but this evolved into a business working within a legal arrangement of patents, concessions, and contracts. Entrepreneurs generated a wealth of records, unlike the small scale opportunistic salvors who often worked outside the law, and therefore left few records. New technology to increase the underwater working time for divers was limited by the technology, as there was a lack of pumping capacity to supply air at depth. The underwater endurance of freedivers was mainly extended by the use of diving bells and engines, which either carried a small volume of air inside, or were laboriously replenished from weighted barrels, severely limiting maximum operating depth and duration. Use of the equipment was also constrained by the weather and sea conditions.

Environmental constraints prevented these salvors from working deeper than about 20 m (66 ft), and while the weather and seas were calm. Search technology—dragging with snag-lines and grapnels—was another limitation, along with imprecise navigation and improper records of shipwreck locations. Salvage was generally only effective on wrecks where the position was already known—where survivors had reported the location, or where a company or government had recorded it. A rare exception to this was William Phip's successful recovery of twenty-six tons of silver in 1687, which inspired a large number of unsuccessful treasure hunts, most of which lost the investors' money.

In the following decades, professional salvors concentrated on recent wrecks where the position was well established. Since the pre-industrial technology severely limited underwater time and mobility and lifting capacity, salvors concentrated on high-value, low bulk cargoes, particularly non-ferrous metals, which retain their value even after long immersion.

A few attempts to raise entire ships, such as the Mary Rose, Vasa, and Royal George usually failed.

The route of the annual Spanish treasure ship fleet went through areas with seasonal bad weather and a large amount of shallow reef, so they expected some of the ships to be wrecked, and were prepared to deal with the losses where practicable by setting up salvage teams of local divers in most major ports along the route. They were fairly efficient at salvaging their cargoes, and usually did not leave much for other contemporary salvors to recover. Salvage teams with divers were sent out as soon as a wreck was reported, so the wreck could be located before it broke up. The available technology made it difficult to recover cargo in environments like rocky lee shores and shallow reefs, which were common sites for ships to be driven ashore. The sea conditions in these areas made it difficult for divers to work from their boats and it was seldom possible to use a diving bell.

In the fourth century BCE, Aristotle described the principle of the diving bell, and there is a well-known claim that Alexander the great once dived in one. In 1531, Guglielmo Lorena used a bell to explore Caligula's pleasure barges, which had sunk in Lake Nemi near Rome.

17th century diving bells extended the time that divers could remain underwater compared to free divers working from the surface, but they were expensive and cumbersome, too dependent on a large support team and boat with lifting gear, and the diver had to work with hooks and grapples to reach sunken objects not directly under the bell, or make breathhold excursions. There were no diving masks available to improve underwater vision, and only ambient light was available, so much of the work was done by feel if visibility was poor, and there was little thermal protection for the diver. A cast copper diving bell used by Francisco Nunez Melián in 1624 for salvage of the cargo of the Santa Margarita in the Florida Keys is recorded to have weighed 680 lb (310 kg) and cost 5000 reales.

The Swedish warship Vasa sank in Stockholm's harbour on its maiden voyage in 1628. Early attempts to refloat the vessel were unsuccessful. In 1658, Albrecht von Treileben was contracted by King Gustavus Adolphus of Sweden to salvage the ship. Between 1663 and 1665, von Treileben's divers were successful in raising most of the bronze cannon, working from a diving bell.

Von Treileben's bell was made of lead, about five feet high, and about the five feet wide at the base, with a small platform suspended from it on which the diver stood. The diver was protected from the cold to some extent by a leather suit, and could work at a depth of 100 feet (30 m) for up to about half an hour, though usually somewhat less.

In 1673, the town of Newcastle upon Tyne contracted Edmund Custis to clear the mouth of the River Tyne of several wrecks of colliers, which had sunk in a spring flood. He accomplished this by exploding a large amount of gunpowder (7 casks) detonated through a tube leading above the surface with a primer charge at the bottom. This was effective in clearing the passage.

In 1687, Sir William Phipps used an inverted container as a diving bell to recover £200,000 worth of treasure from a Spanish ship sunk off the coast of San Domingo.

The astronomer Edmond Halley built a diving bell in 1691 to examine a wreck off the south coast of England, using a system of weighted barrels and tubes to replenish the air in the bell. Though Halley is generally credited with this device, there is evidence that a similar system was used in the Vasa salvage some decades earlier. Halley claimed to have dived to 9 to 10 fathoms (16 to 18 m) for over an hour and a half without any injuries.

Two Englishmen, John Lethbridge and Jacob Rowe, invented what they called "diving engines", which they successfully used for a few decades. These were wooden or metal cylinders with glass viewports and armholes sealed to the diver by leather sleeves. The breathing air supply was the air sealed inside at the surface, and carbon dioxide buildup would continue during the dive, becoming unbearable after about half an hour, at which point it could be replenished at the surface by flushing with a bellows. These devices were early forerunners of atmospheric diving suits, as the interior remained at surface pressure. The main difference between these suits was that Lethbridge's was made of wood staves with straight sides, while Rowe used copper with a backward curve from the knees to the feet.

Lethbridge and Rowe salvaged recent wrecks of Dutch East Indiamen with considerable success because the locations were well known, and the ships were outward bound carrying silver to buy trade goods in the East. To take advantage of seasonal winds, ships would depart at predictable times twice per year, and took a route around the north of the Shetland Islands, with stops at Madeira or the Cape Verde Islands and Cape Town. Consequently, most of the ships that were wrecked ended up on the same group of reefs.

Lethbridge and Rowe worked together on the outward bound British East Indiaman Vansittart, which had been wrecked in the Cape Verde Islands in 1719. They recovered a large amount of silver, ingots of lead, iron guns and anchors. Thereafter, Lethbridge made some unsuccessful searches for wrecks off the south coast of England, then took a contract with the VOC in Madeira on the Slot ter Hooge, followed by more successful missions in South Africa around Cape Town.

Rowe moved north to Scotland, and after some unsuccessful work on a ship from the Spanish Armada, got to work salvaging another recent VOC wreck, the Adelaar, with considerable success. The "diving engines" were quite effective when used by their designers, but do not appear ever to have been upgraded, and the type was never used by any later salvors.

Within twelve days of the sinking of the Mary Rose in 1545, a salvage attempt was started under the direction of two Italians, who attempted to apply the tidal lift technique, using two large merchant ships Jesus of Lübeck and Samson, each rated at 700 tons, and lightened as much as possible to serve as lifting pontoons. They only managed to dislodge the mainmast being used as the lifting point, later being abandoned. Similar unsuccessful attempts were made to raise the Vasa in 1628 and the Royal George in 1783. These attempts were made challenging by being made on some of the largest ships of their time.

=== 19th century ===
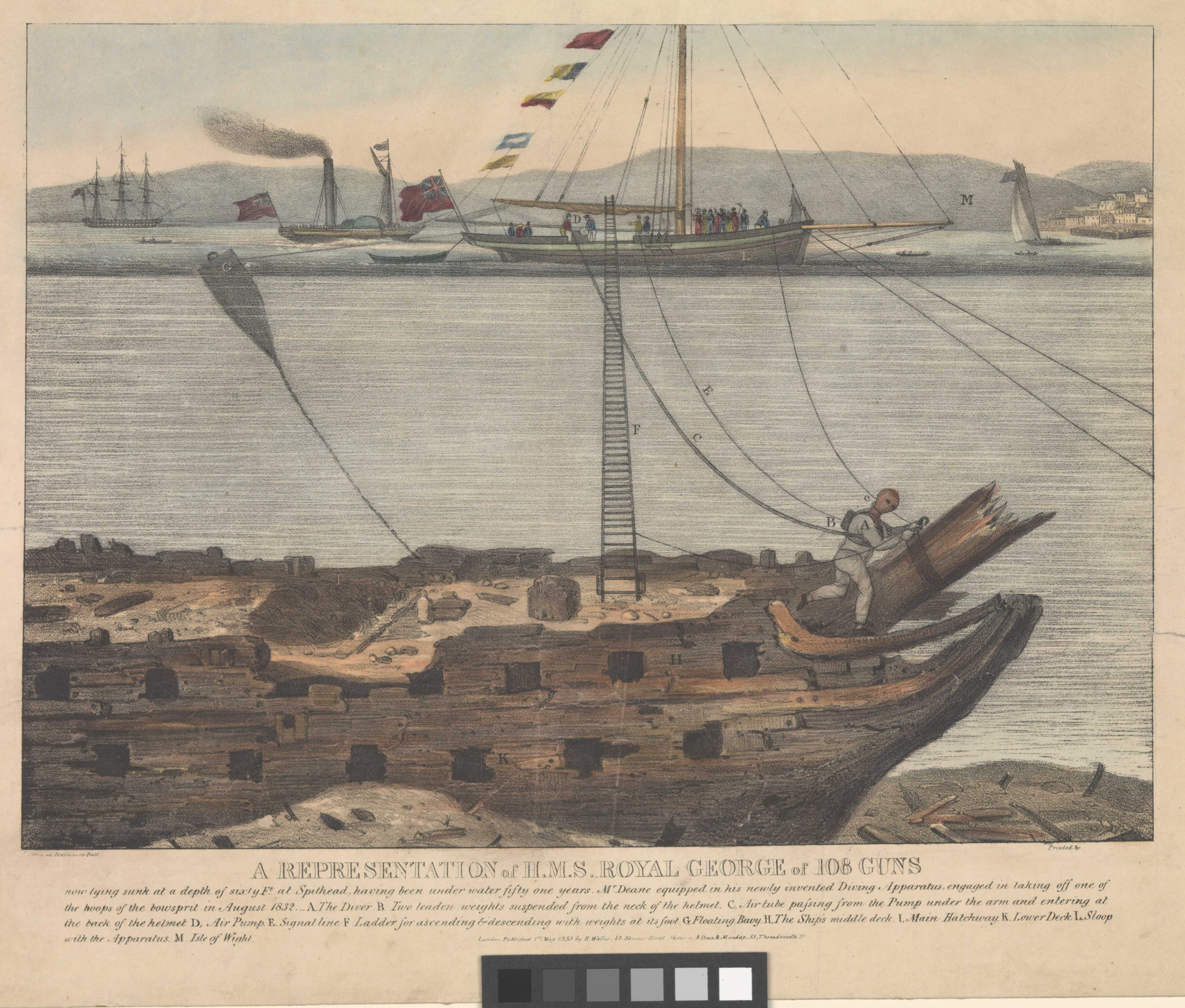
Illustration of Charles Anthony Deane exploring the wreck of HMS Royal George in 1832

The era of modern salvage operations was inaugurated with the development of the first surface supplied diving helmets by the English inventors Charles and John Deane as well as Augustus Siebe, in the 1830s. HMS Royal George, a 100-gun first-rate ship of the line of the Royal Navy, sank undergoing routine maintenance work in 1782, and the Deane brothers were commissioned to perform salvage work on the wreck. Using their new pumped air diving helmets, they managed to recover about two dozen cannons. Following on from this success, Colonel of the Royal Engineers Charles Pasley commenced the first large scale salvage operation in 1839. His plan was to break up the wreck of Royal George with gunpowder charges and then salvage as much as possible using divers.

Pasley's diving salvage operation set many diving milestones, including the first recorded use of the buddy system in diving, when he ordered that his divers operate in pairs. In addition, the first emergency swimming ascent was made by a diver after his air line became tangled and he had to cut it free. However, the first medical account of a helmet squeeze was suffered by a Private Williams—the early diving helmets used had no non-return valves on the breathing air supply hose; this meant that if a hose became severed near or above the surface, the high-pressure air around the diver's head rapidly escaped from the helmet leaving a large pressure difference between the water and the suit and helmet interior that tended to force the diver into rigid interior of the helmet. At the British Association for the Advancement of Science meeting in 1842, Sir John Richardson described the diving apparatus and treatment of diver Roderick Cameron following an injury that occurred on 14 October 1841 during the salvage operations.

Pasley recovered 12 more guns in 1839, 11 more in 1840, and six in 1841. In 1842, he recovered only one iron 12-pounder because he ordered the divers to concentrate on removing the hull timbers rather than search for guns. Other items recovered in 1840 included the surgeon's brass instruments, silk garments of satin weave 'of which the silk was perfect', and pieces of leather; but no woolen clothing. By 1843, the whole of the keel and the bottom timbers had been raised and the site was declared clear.

=== 20th century ===
From 1917–1924, 44 tons of gold bullion were recovered from the SS Laurentic sunk off Lough Swilly by a German mine on 25 January 1917. Guybon Chesney Castell Damant's team were successful in recovering all but 25 of the 3211 bars of gold. As of 2023, the salvage is the largest recovery of sunken gold by weight in history.

The largest marine salvage operation on record was the raising of the German High Seas Fleet which was scuttled at Scapa Flow in 1919. Between 1922–1939, 45 of the 52 warships sunk: six battleships, five battlecruisers, five cruisers, and 32 destroyers. They were raised from depths of up to 45 metres (0.028 mi), primarily by Cox & Danks & Metal Industries, and broken up for scrap.

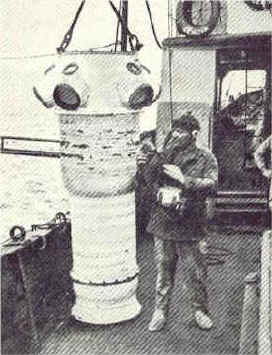
The torretta butoscopica closed observation bell

SS Egypt was a P&O ocean liner that sank after a collision with SS Seine on 20 May 1922 in the Celtic Sea, with a cargo that included gold and silver bullion and gold sovereigns worth over £1 million. After the wreck was found in 1930, a salvage operation recovered most of the cargo of gold and silver. Giovanni Quaglia from the Genoese company Società Ricuperi Marittimi (So.Ri.Ma.) used the ship Artiglio. A specially-built armoured suit, or observation bell, called torretta butoscopica, was used with a diver inside who was able to direct the salvage operations and the placing of explosives to blast the ship open to expose the strong room. The diver then directed a grab which picked up the gold and silver. The salvage continued until 1935, when 98% of the contents of the strongroom had been recovered.

In April 1941, in the face of British Army advances in the East African campaign, Italian Rear Admiral Mario Bonetti successfully blocked the Red Sea harbour of Massawa by scuttling 18 large commercial ships, 13 smaller coastal vessels, a floating crane, and two critically important dry docks. British planners quickly initiated salvage operations to restore usefulness to the strategic harbour. However, the British civilian salvage team spent a fruitless year struggling against the oppressive heat and humidity, which persistently caused multiple industrial air compressors to fail, dropping half-floated ships back to the harbour silt. Progress was at a standstill until the American salvage expert Edward Ellsberg arrived in April 1942 to work in parallel. Ellsberg's team opened the harbour and restored the largest dry dock to service in less than six weeks, and many of the blockships were refloated by Ellsberg over the next several months, as the British civilian contractor continued to fail in every salvage attempt. Ellsberg wrote about his experience in the 1946 book Under the Red Sea Sun.

As part of the harbour clearance and ship recovery after the attack on Pearl Harbor, USS California and USS West Virginia, resting on the bottom of Pearl Harbor on 7 December 1941, were refloated and repaired. They were key participants in the Battle of Surigao Strait in October 1944.

In 1943–1944, the Great Lakes salvage engineer, Captain John Roen, did what was considered financially impossible and salvaged SS George M. Humphrey, which sank in a collision in 23 metres (77 ft) of water in the Straits of Mackinac, by first removing the ore it was carrying and then using two vessels on each side of the underwater wreck, with cables that "walked" George M. Humphrey in stages underwater to shallower water where it was then pumped out and re-floated and towed out. Some of the techniques developed by Roen for the salvage of George M. Humphrey established methods which became new standards for future salvages, where before many wrecks were considered too heavy and large to salvage.

The Swedish 17th-century warship Vasa was raised between 1957 and April 1961 as a historical artifact of national importance. It had been lying on the bottom of Stockholm harbour since capsizing on its maiden voyage in 1628.

The raising and subsequent conservation of Mary Rose, the flagship of the navy of King Henry VIII, which sank in 1545 in the Solent, North of the Isle of Wight. As with Vasa, the salvage of Mary Rose in 1982 was an operation of immense complexity and was a major achievement in marine archaeology. The remains of the ship, together with recovered weapons, sailing equipment and crew's personal effects are now on display at Portsmouth Historic Dockyard and the nearby Mary Rose Museum.

In 1968, Shipwrecks Inc., headed by E. Lee Spence, was granted South Carolina State Salvage License No. 1 to salvage the wreck of the American Civil War blockade runner SS Georgiana under that state's new underwater antiquities act, which had been drafted and passed at the instigation of Spence, who had discovered the wreck in 1965. Spence's work on the wreck was some of the first underwater archaeology done in the United States. Shipwrecks Inc. raised over 1,000,000 individual artifacts, conservatively valued at over $12,000,000. The artifacts ranged from tiny brass sewing pins and glass buttons to heavy iron cannons and included such things as cannonballs, bullets, bottles, pottery, carved bone toothbrushes, pencils, match cases, and Wedgwood china.

In 1974, the U.S. CIA attempted to recover the sunken Soviet Golf-class submarine K-129 in the secret and expensive intelligence operation Project Azorian. The attempt was reported to be only partially successful.

Nuestra Señora de Atocha was discovered in 1985 with recovered gold and other artifacts worth an estimated US$400 million.

Recovery of debris and crew of the space shuttle Challenger in 1986 off Florida after it disintegrated shortly after liftoff due to a mechanical defect.

The SS Central America, which sank in 1857 carrying 14,000 kilograms (30,000 lb) of gold, was discovered in 1988. Salvage efforts remain incomplete.

There has been a search for the wreckage and flight data recorders of South African Airways Flight 295 at 4,900 metres (16,000 ft) near Mauritius, and the recovery of some wreckage and the cockpit voice recorder.

The external tank used on Space Shuttle mission STS-71 was involved in an at-sea rescue which resulted in a historic court case. The tank was being delivered by barge to the launch site in November 1994, when the tow vehicle encountered issues in Hurricane Gordon. Their mayday signal was picked up by the oil tanker Cherry Valley, which responded and towed the tug and its cargo to safety. NASA offered $5 million to the crew of the tanker (the salvors) as a reward, but the United States Department of Justice reduced the offer to $1 million. The tanker company and crew sued and were awarded $6.4 million, believed to be the largest such award in U.S. history. This was reduced to $4.125 million on appeal. The crew split the award with their employer. At least one crew member was able to use his cut of the proceeds to buy a house, which he calls "the house that NASA bought." The case has been the subject of at least one law review article analyzing the economics of salvage.

=== 21st century ===
On 12 August 2000, the Russian Oscar-class submarine Kursk sank in the Barents Sea following an internal explosion, leading to the death of 118 crew-members. A portion of the destroyed submarine was raised to the surface in 2001 to recover the bodies and eliminate the hazard from Kursk's two nuclear reactors.

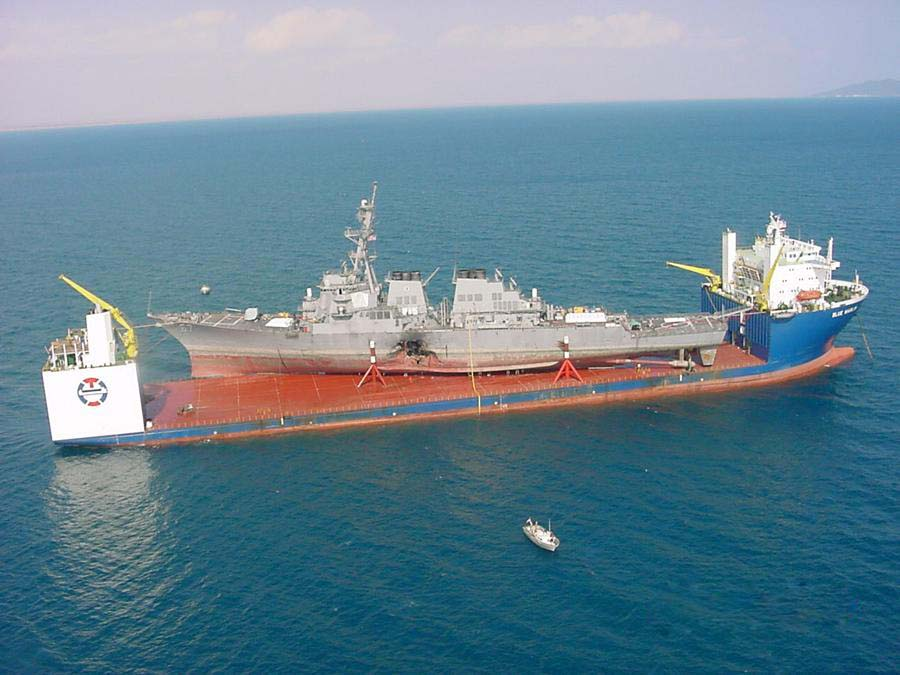
USS Cole being carried by MV Blue Marlin

USS Cole was severely damaged in October 2000 by terrorists while it was harboured in the Yemeni port of Aden. It was salvaged, transported back to the US on the heavy transport ship Blue Marlin, and repaired to serve again.

In July 2002, HMS Nottingham suffered serious damage due to a navigational error, striking Wolf Rock near Lord Howe Island. It was towed, stern first to Newcastle, New South Wales, in August 2002 for minor repairs, and was consequently returned to the United Kingdom aboard the heavy lifting vessel MV Swan.

In July 2006, the Japanese car carrier Cougar Ace, carrying 4,700 Mazda cars and Isuzu trucks bound for the North American market, was traveling from Japan to Vancouver, British Columbia, when during an exchange of ballast water south of the Aleutian Islands, the car carrier lost stability and developed a 60° list to port. The ship's condition quickly began to deteriorate as it took on water. The salvage team worked for 24 days to save the vessel and its cargo.

In May 2007, Odyssey Marine Exploration undertook the Black Swan Project and recovered an estimated US$500 million in silver and gold coins from a shipwreck in the Atlantic Ocean. However, the wreck and its contents were claimed by the Spanish government. A legal dispute through United States Federal Courts was resolved in February 2012, when it was reported that U.S. Magistrate Judge Mark Pizzo had ordered Odyssey to return the coins to Spain by 24 February 2012 for dispersal to museums, not to heirs. The Supreme Court declined to stay this order and Odyssey has agreed to abide by the decision. In 2021, Phoenix International Holdings, Inc. (Phoenix), under the direction of the U.S. Navy's Supervisor of Salvage and Diving (SUPSALV), located and recovered the fuselage of a downed MH-60 Seahawk helicopter in the Philippine Sea from a record breaking depth of 5,814 metres (19,075 ft) beneath the surface. This is 81 metres (266 ft) deeper than the previous salvage record, also set by Phoenix and SUPSALV during the recovery of a C-2 Greyhound aircraft in 2019.

=== Technological advances ===
Progress of salvage capacity depends on accumulated knowledge, new ideas and their application, and the demand for services. The technological evolution of the late 20th century included:

- Surface and underwater navigational systems that allow precise definition of target location and consistent return to the position,
- Search systems that facilitate fine-grained searches over large areas at greater depths,
- Imaging systems for identification and inspection of bottom objects and definition of debris fields,
- Seafloor mapping systems that precisely define bottom topography,
- Compact, high-efficiency camera and optical systems that can produce near-daylight conditions with far-reaching penetration in clear seawater,
- Submersibles and atmospheric diving systems that allow manned salvage operations beyond the ambient pressure diving depth limits,
- ROVs for unmanned, long-duration salvage operations at virtually any depth,
- AUVs for long range search at virtually any depth, unaffected by surface conditions,
- Lightweight, high-strength fiber optic umbilicals for high bandwidth command, control and data transmission,
- Acoustic communication links, for through-water data transfer
- High-strength, low density, synthetic lift lines, almost unaffected by self-weight, as the specific gravity is usually close to that of water, and unjacketed ultra-high-molecular-weight polyethylene (UHMWPE) (Spectra or Dyneema) will float,
- Ship motion compensating systems, which can minimise shock loading and resonance problems in lifting cables,
- Dynamic positioning systems for surface ships, which allow precise station keeping,
- Satellite communication systems.

== See also ==
- Brussels Convention on Assistance and Salvage at Sea – International convention on maritime assistance and salvage
- Damage control (maritime) – Emergency management of situations which may cause the loss of a ship
- Emergency tow vessel – Type of ship used for towing disabled vessels across high seas to safe waters
- International Convention on Salvage – 1989 treaty on maritime assistance and salvage
- Lifting bag – Airtight bag used for underwater buoyant lifting when filled with air
- Maritime archaeology – Archaeological study of human interaction with the sea
- Maritime law – Law of the oceans and their use
- Nairobi International Convention on the Removal of Wrecks – 2007 treaty
- Receiver of Wreck – Official who administers law dealing with maritime wrecks and salvage
- Rescue and salvage ship – Type of military salvage tug
- Salvage diving – Diving work associated with the recovery of vehicles, cargo and structures
- Salvage tug – Specialized type of tugboat
- Scuttling – Act of deliberately sinking a ship by allowing water to flow into the hull
- Search and rescue – Search for and provision of aid to people who are in distress or imminent danger
- Shipwreck – Physical remains of a beached or sunk ship
- Submarine rescue ship – Support ship for submarine rescue and deep-sea salvage operations
- Treasure hunting – Physical search for treasure
- USS Arizona salvaged artifacts – List of salvaged artifacts from the sunken US battleship Arizona
- Wreck diving – Recreational diving on wrecks
- Wrecking (shipwreck) – Community salvage of shipwrecks

=== People ===
- Charles Anthony Deane – English diving engineer and inventor of a surface supplied diving helmet
- Michael Hatcher – British explorer and marine salvor (born 1940)
- Augustus Siebe – British engineer mostly known for his contributions to diving equipment
- E. Lee Spence – Underwater archaeologist
