= Law of salvage =

Principle of maritime law

The law of salvage is a principle of maritime law whereby any person who helps recover another person's ship or cargo in peril at sea is entitled to a reward commensurate with the value of the property saved.

Maritime law is inherently international, and although salvage laws vary from one country to another, generally there are established conditions to be met to allow a claim of salvage. The vessel must be in peril, either immediate or forthcoming; the "salvor" must be acting voluntarily and under no pre-existing contract; and some life or property must be successfully saved. A modern addition rewards a salvor for the prevention of oil spills and environmental damage.

== The basis of marine salvage law ==
With its origins in antiquity, the basis of salvage is that a person helping another at sea is putting himself and his vessel at risk and should be appropriately rewarded. A related consideration was to prevent piracy, since any vessel in peril might well be abandoned to pirates if the owner did not reward an honest salvor. Salvage law has been recognized for centuries in such documents as the edicts of Rhodes and the Roman Digest of Justinian. It is still a nearly universally recognized right, though conditions for awards of salvage vary from country to country.

The right to be rewarded for salvage at sea is based both on principles of fairness and public policy: the law seeks to be fair both to the property owners and to the salvors. The legal entitlement to a salvage reward arises when a person, acting as a volunteer (that is, without any pre-existing contractual or other legal duty so to act), preserves or contributes so to preserving at sea any vessel, cargo, freight, or other recognized subject of salvage from danger.

A salvage situation arises when a shipowner accepts an offer of help from a salvor. To that extent, the arrangement is contractual, but it is not a contract for services with a pre-arranged fee (such as, say, a towage contract). Instead, the law provides that after the service is done a court or arbitrator will make an award taking into account:

- the degree of success of the salvage venture
- the degree of danger of the salvage venture
- the value of the property salved
- whether a reasonable attempt to protect the coastal environment was made
- the provisions of Articles 13 & 14 of the Salvage Convention 1989.

A formal contract is not strictly necessary, provided there is evidence that the owner has acquiesced in the salvor's intervention. The assumption here is that when faced with the loss of his vessel and cargo, a reasonable prudent owner would have accepted salvage terms offered, even if time did not permit such negotiations. Even so, the shipowner is entitled to reject any offer of help, and would do so if the shipping line had already made arrangements with a professional salvor of their choice.

There is no equivalent to salvage when ashore: a person who assists another on land has no entitlement unless a court deems that an implied contract had arisen, whether objectively or subjectively.

=== Recognized subject matter ===
Traditionally, salvage only recognizes a ship or craft ("vessel"), cargo on board, freight payable, and bunkers carried on board as the subject of property in danger.

The scope of salvage has been expanded by the 1989 Salvage Convention, and protection of the environment is part of salvage. Oil pollution can cause damage to the environment. If the salvor prevents oil pollution from happening, he indeed performs a valuable service to the community as mentioned by (1997) 1 Lloyd's Rep 323 (HL), pp. 326–328. Therefore, the salvor will be rewarded with special compensation, i.e., liability salvage instead of property salvage.

The convention does not consider saving lives to be part of salvage, but if one vessel saves life and the other saves property, the arbitrator may apportion the salvage reward between them as he thinks fit.

=== Real peril ===
Danger needs to be real but not necessarily immediate or absolute. The subject of salvage must be in real danger, which means the property is exposed to damage or destruction.

The burden of proof lies on the salvor, which means the salvor needs to prove real danger existed when the performance of service commenced. The court or arbitrators must determine whether the property was truly in danger. As every situation differs, both subjective and objective tests will be conducted. Common considerations are:

1. Would a reasonable Master of the vessel in distress have answered yes or no to the offer of assistance?
2. Was there a real apprehension of danger even though that danger may not have been absolute or immediate?
3. Was the danger fanciful or so remote as only to be a distant possibility?

It is incumbent upon the court to assess the existence and level of danger, both present and future. The case of the Troilus (1951 1 Lloyd's Rep. 467, HL) illustrated the concept of future danger that the court must take into account when determining the existence of danger. In this particular case, the cargo owners contended that the ship was in perfect safety when she reached Aden, and therefore it constituted ocean towage but not salvage when towing from Aden to UK. The court held that even though the ship and cargo was in physical safety, the services rendered still amounted to salvage service on the grounds that the master of a damaged ship must do his best to preserve the ship and cargo and bring them to their destination as cheaply and efficiently as possible. The salvage award was reasonable as long as the master acts reasonably for the combined benefit of ship and cargo.

In the modern world, the dispute normally is not about whether there is just the existence of danger, but also the degree of danger, as it determines the extent of the award.

=== Voluntary service ===
Voluntary means that the services are not rendered under a pre-existing contract agreement or under official duty or purely for the self-preservation interests of the salvor. Because of this, there is no limitation to the class of persons that can be considered as volunteers.

A pre-existing agreement refers to any agreement entered into before the time of the existence of danger. It includes ship's master and crew who have pre-existing employment agreement with ship-owners. They have the duty to preserve the ship and cargo, and therefore they cannot convert themselves into salvors in the event of trouble.

Notwithstanding, exceptions still exist in this area. Salvage can still be rendered if the pilot or crews of the ship in peril rendered service outside or beyond the scope of their duties under the contract. The case of the Sandefjord (1953 2 Lloyd's Rep. 557) held that the pilot brought his personal knowledge of the local conditions and his seafaring skills to bear when faced with a grounding. Moreover, the pilot relieved the ship owner of paying a vast salvage award for tug assistance. Under these conditions, the pilot was entitled to a salvage award.

Crewmen cannot claim themselves as individual salvors unless their employment contract has been actually or constructively terminated before the salvage service commenced. The termination of contract could be brought by:

1. authorized abandonment of the ship under the Master's authority; or
2. the Master's discharge of the crew concerned; or
3. the capture of the vessel in hostile encounter.

Authorized abandonment refers to a condition wherein, at the time the Master decided to abandon ship, there was no hope or intention of returning to the stricken ship. There can be no suggestion that a mere temporary abandonment would dissolve the crew's contract of employment. The case of the Albionic (1941 70 L1.L.Rep.257) ruled that there was no express order given by the Master to abandon the ship, and therefore the crew's contracts of service were not terminated at the time when they performed the salvage service. The San Demetrio (1941 69 L1.L.Rep.5) case demonstrated a good example of an authorized abandonment of ship under the Master's authority. If the ship was properly abandoned under the orders from the master, the vessel's own crews who saved the vessel or cargo on board were entitled to claim salvage.

In the case of the Master's discharge of crew concerned, the Warrior Lush (476) case ruled that if the crew is properly discharged by the master, their employment contract is validly terminated. Therefore, any crew who returned to and saved the vessel were truly salvors.

Additionally, hostile capture of the crew effectively causes the dissolution of the sailors' employment contract, as the general and expected duties for the seamen no longer exist. The Two Friends (1799 1 Ch Rob 271) provided support for this argument.

=== Success ===
The requirement for the service to be successful can be summed up from the common expression no cure; no pay. However, success need not be total. Partial success, provided that there is some measure of preservation to the owners, is sufficient. The Tojo Maru (1972 AC 242 HL) examined certain characteristics of salvage contracts and concluded that the primary consideration is that the person rendering the salvage service is not entitled to any remuneration unless he saves the property in whole or in part.

If the ship's peril following the service is as grave as before, no award will be given. Likewise, if the salvage services which rescue a vessel from one danger eventually make the situation worse, no salvage award is typically granted. The Melanie v The San Onofre (1925 AC 246) held that the services which rescued a vessel from one danger, but eventually left her in a position of even greater danger, did not contribute to ultimate success and therefore do not amount to salvage. The ship owner as well as the claimant are expected to adhere to the maritime laws to ensure they succeed.

=== Salvor-in-possession ===
The rights of the salvor can be secured, in addition to maritime lien, by a right of possession over the yet-to-be-recovered property. When the ship is no longer in possession of its master, this salvor-in-possession status is granted to the first salvor who takes possession and demonstrates capability of a successful salvage.

== Salvage under contract ==
Salvage may not necessarily arise from an actual contract. However, there are vessels standing by, crewed by professional salvors under a salvage agreement in Lloyd's Open Form (LOF).

Contracts are usually entered into on the LOF (1980, 1990, 1995 and now 2000 LOF). Under these contracts, rewards are based on no cure, no pay principle, in which the salvor receives no reward if no property is saved. Special compensation is paid, however, as a reward for efforts to prevent or minimize damage to the environment even if no property is saved under the convention.

== Minimizing danger to the environment ==
While the general principle of salvage law has been no cure; no pay, special consideration had to be given as more vessels were propelled by internal combustion engines, with the related environmental hazards that were possible if one were to sink. The concept of the safety net in LOF1980 took steps to protect the environment from oil pollution. Following this concept of the safety net, the Salvage Convention of 1989 introduced the concept of special compensation to encourage salvors to preserve and minimize damage to the environment from fuel and oil spills. However, the concept was very different from the "special compensation" under the existing convention.

Under Article 14(1) the salvor is entitled to special compensation if he has carried out salvage operation on a vessel which by itself or its cargo threatens damage to the environment. It must come with the failure to earn a reward under Article 13 which is "at least equivalent to the special compensation assessable in accordance with the Article". This special compensation is obtainable from the owner of the vessel, and is equivalent to the salvor's expenses. The salvor does not necessarily have to achieve success in preventing and minimizing damage to the environment in obtaining special compensation. If success is achieved, special compensation will be payable in greater amount under Article 14 (2) as follows:

If the salvage operation actually prevents or minimizes damage to the environment, the salvor will be able to claim enhanced special compensation with the provision of Article 14(2). The amount of the salvage award may be increased up to a maximum of 30 percent of the expenses incurred by the salvor. The possibility exists that an arbitrator may increase the special compensation to 100 percent of the expenses incurred, if warranted by circumstances. However, negligence on the part of the salvor will deprive his right of the whole or part of any special compensation under Article 14 (5). In order to claim special compensation, it must be shown that the vessel itself or the cargo threatened damage to the environment. This goes further than the environmental safety net provisions in LOF 1980 which were limited to tankers laden with oil.

Articles 13 and 14 are both incorporated in the LOFs 1990 and 1995 by reference and LOF 2000 is made subject to the English Law.

== Jurisdiction ==
Under the LOF contracts, the parties submit to the jurisdiction of a Lloyd's arbitrator to determine the amount of award. But salvage is also a remedy that arises independently of a contract.

A salvage claim, outside the LOF arbitration agreement, can be brought in the Admiralty Court and is defined under CPR r 61.1 (2) (f) to mean:

1. for or in the nature of salvage;
2. for special compensation under Article 14;
3. for the appointment of salvage; and
4. arising out of or connected with any contract for salvage services.

The claim is enforceable in personam and in rem. The ship or the sister ship can be held in lien to enforce the claim. A property salvage attracts a maritime lien against all property saved; however, the liability salvage (special compensation under Article 14) does not.

== Time limit to claim the salvage ==
Article 23 of the 1989 Convention provides for a two-year limit to commence judicial or arbitration proceedings arising from a salvage claim. The limitation commences on the date on which the salvage operations are terminated. During the two-year period, an extension of time can be agreed by parties. An action for indemnity by a person liable may be instituted after the expiration of the limitation period with the assumption that it is brought within the time allowed by the states in which the proceedings are brought.

However, if the ship is not saved and the loss was due to the salvor's negligence, the time limit to bring action against the salvor will be based on the tort of negligence.

== See also ==
- Marine salvage#Ship salvage and the law – Recovering a ship or cargo after a maritime casualty
- Brussels Convention on Assistance and Salvage at Sea – International convention on maritime assistance and salvage
- International Convention on Salvage – international convention on maritime assistance and salvage
- Nairobi International Convention on the Removal of Wrecks – international convention on maritime assistance and salvage
- Merchant Shipping Act 1854 – British maritime legislation.
- General average
