= Semco Salvage & Marine Pte Ltd v Lancer Navigation, The Nagasaki Spirit =

English admiralty law case on marine salvage

Semco Salvage & Marine Pte Ltd v Lancer Navigation Co Ltd, The Nagasaki Spirit
- Court: House of Lords
- Decided: 1997
- Citation: [1997] 1 Lloyds Rep 323

Case opinions
- Lord Mustill

Keywords
- Marine salvage, LOF, SCOPIC

Semco Salvage & Marine Pte Ltd v Lancer Navigation Co Ltd, The Nagasaki Spirit [1997] is an English admiralty law case on marine salvage and on the provisions of Article 13 and 14 of the 1989 Salvage Convention.

The case identified problems with the drafting of the convention, a response to which was the 2000 SCOPIC codicil which may be attached to the Lloyd's Open Form ("LOF") to vary the terms of the salvage reward.

== Facts ==
The case involved a collision in 1992 between the oil tanker Nagasaki Spirit, laden with 40,000 tons of crude oil, and the container ship, Ocean Blessing in the northern part of the Malacca Straits. After the collision some 12,000 tons of crude oil escaped into the sea and caught fire; both vessels were engulfed in flames. All the crew of the Ocean Blessing perished and only two crew on The Nagasaki Spirit survived. Professional salvors agreed to salve the Nagasaki Spirit under LOF 1990 (which included Arts 13 and 14 of the convention). Using several tugs, the fire was extinguished, the cargo transshipped and the vessel safely redelivered to her owners.

It has been speculated that the collision was a result of the vessel having been taken by pirates who then abandoned ship, leaving the vessel still under way yet without any bridge officers in control, or that the Nagasaki Spirit was manoeuvring erratically to avoid a pirate attack.

== Judgments ==
The award arbitrator fixed special compensation, stressing the need to encourage environmental salvage.

The appeal arbitrator increased the Art. 13 award, and since that was higher than the Art. 14 award, he held that no special compensation was available.

On appeal, the admiralty judge held that although "fair rate" imported the idea of remuneration, which would normally include a profit element, the appeal arbitrator was right to reject this.

The Court of Appeal agreed with the judge, so that "fair rate" was not to be a "salvage reward".

In the House of Lords, Lord Mustill also agreed that "fair rate" meant "fair rate of expenditure" and did not include any element of profit.

(Because it was interpreting an international convention, the House of Lords had felt constrained to interpret its provisions "literally", rather than "purposively".)

== Significance ==
Following on from the innovations of the LOF 1980, the International Convention on Salvage permitted salvage rewards to be made to salvors who acted to limit damage to the coastal environment after oil spills. Articles 13 & 14 of the convention made provision for "special compensation", but The Nagasaki Spirit revealed that the convention had been poorly drafted, thereby limiting the amount that environmental salvors could be paid to mere out-of-pocket expenses, with no allowance for any profit margin. As an antidote to this, the marine insurance industry and P&I clubs jointly developed the "SCOPIC clause" ("Special Compensation – P&I Clubs"), which is a codicil that may be appended to an LOF and invoked should the statutory payment provisions prove inadequate. The first SCOPIC clause was in 2000, and there have been several iterations since.

== See also ==
- Marine salvage – Recovering a ship or cargo after a maritime casualty
- Lloyd's Open Form – Contract for marine salvage
- Protection and indemnity insurance § SCOPIC
- Piracy in the Strait of Malacca – Piracy in the China Sea
