= British possession =

Lands with British monarch not in the UK

Map of the British possessions, by common statutory definition, on the Robinson projection centred on the 10th meridian east

A British possession, in common statutory usage, is a country or territory other than the United Kingdom which has the British monarch as its head of state.

== Overview ==
In common statutory usage the British possessions include British Overseas Territories, and the Commonwealth realms but not protectorates. British admiralty law has a less expansive meaning under the Merchant Shipping Act 1995, where a "relevant British possession" includes the Crown Dependencies (the Isle of Man and the Channel Islands) and "any colony" (the self-governing British Overseas Territories). It may also be used more expansively, to refer to member states of the Commonwealth of Nations which have a continuing tradition of British law even after they have become republics, and even if those countries no longer recognize themselves as British possessions.

Although the term enjoyed some use in statutes prior to 1889, the formal definition of British possession came in the Interpretation Act 1889, which was superseded by the current Interpretation Act 1978.

== Definition ==
=== 1889 and 1978 definition ===
Two acts in the Parliament of the United Kingdom define the current status of British possessions: the Interpretation Act 1978 and the Interpretation Act 1889. In the reign of Queen Victoria (r. 1837–1901), the Interpretation Act 1889 defined the British possessions in its article 18, section 2:

"British possession" means any part of Her Majesty's dominions outside the United Kingdom; and where parts of such dominions are under both a central and a local legislature, all parts under the central legislature are deemed, for the purposes of this definition, to be one British possession.

— Interpretation Act 1889, 18.2

According to the 1890 1st edition of Stroud's Judicial Dictionary, this definition applied to "In all Acts of Parliament passed after the 31st Dec. 1889". According to Kenneth Roberts-Wray's 1966 Commonwealth and Colonial Law, this definition "includes the Channel Islands and the Isle of Man for they are not in the United Kingdom, q. v.". The last part of this definition had already appeared in earlier legislation, including in the Patents, Designs, and Trade Marks Act 1883 (46 & 47 Vict. c. 57). Hence, according to the 1933 11th volume of the 2nd edition of Halsbury's Laws of England edited by Douglas Hogg, 1st Viscount Hailsham:

A British possession is defined by statute to be any part of the British dominions except the United Kingdom, and its territorial waters. When parts of such dominions are under both a central and a local legislature, all parts under the central legislature are deemed to be one British possession. But this principle applies only to matters falling within the authority of the central legislature.

— Halsbury's Laws of England, 2nd ed., Vol. XI, "Dominions, colonies, possessions, protectorates, and mandated territories", Part 1, section 1, subsection 1 "Definitions", 2 "British possession".

Halsbury's Laws of England noted that a different definition is used where necessary to include subnational entities as British possessions, rather than only the federations of which they are part: "In certain Acts the term includes both the part under the central legislature and those under local legislatures" and "These cases are necessary where the central legislature is denied the power to deal with the subject-matter".

In the reign of Elizabeth II (r. 1952–2022), the Interpretation Act 1978 defined the British possessions in its schedule 1, with text identical to that in the 1889 act. According to Ian Hendry and Susan Dickson in the 2018 2nd edition of British Overseas Territories Law, "the definition is evidently very wide" and the term is "anomalous as far as independent states covered by it are concerned".

According to Roberts-Wray in 1966: "This expression is now rarely used; like other terms it is discredited. For obvious reasons it clearly implies subordination. That objection would be overcome to some extent if it did not exclude the United Kingdom; but the word "British" would still be questionable for the same reason as in the case of "the British Commonwealth of Nations."" According to Michael J. Strauss's 2015 Territorial Leasing in Diplomacy and International Law, "it is not uncommon for countries to use the term "possessions" for territories they control". According to Hendry and Dickson in 2018, while "the term appears in some statutes, its use in modern times is rare". According to the 2021 reissue of the 13th volume of the 5th edition of Halsbury's Laws of England, the terms "'British possession', 'British settlement', 'colony', 'protectorate' and 'protected state'" are "now effectively obsolete". (Note: In the 21st century, the term appears in the Sanctions and Anti-Money Laundering Act 2018, the Wreck Removal Convention Act 2011, and the Merchant Shipping (Pollution) Act 2006.)

=== Early definitions ===
==== Vice Admiralty Courts Act 1863 ====
The Vice Admiralty Courts Act 1863 (26 & 27 Vict. c. 24) defined the British possessions in its article 2:

"British Possession" shall mean any Colony, Plantation, Settlement, Island, or Territory being a Part of Her Majesty's Dominions, but not being within the Limits of the United Kingdom of Great Britain and Ireland, or of Her Majesty's Possessions in India

— Vice Admiralty Courts Act 1863, 2

According to Roberts-Wray, the definition in the Vice Admiralty Courts Act 1863 shows that "Early definitions were afflicted by the prolixity of nineteenth-century conveyancing counsel, who probably drafted them".

In earlier legislation, such as the Colonial Laws Validity Act 1865, the term "colonies" had been used to distinguish "all of Her Majesty's Possessions abroad in which there shall exist a Legislature". The Colonial Laws Validity Act 1865 specifically excluded the Channel Islands and the Isle of Man from the definition of "colony".

==== Documentary Evidence Act 1868 ====
The Documentary Evidence Act 1868 defined a "British Colony and Possession" in its section 6:

"British Colony and Possession" shall for the Purposes of this Act include the Channel Islands, the Isle of Man, and such Territories as may for the Time being be vested in Her Majesty by virtue of any Act of Parliament for the Government of India and all other Her Majesty's Dominions.

— Documentary Evidence Act 1868, 5

The definition of "British Colony and Possession" in the Documentary Evidence Act 1868 includes the Channel Islands and the Isles of Man, but does not exclude the United Kingdom itself. According to Roberts-Wray, this was an "accident".

==== Coinage Act 1870 ====
The Coinage Act 1870 defined the British possessions in its article 2:

The term "British possession" means any colony, plantation, island, territory, or settlement within Her Majesty's dominions and not within the United Kingdom

— Coinage Act 1870, 2

According to David Murray Fox and Wolfgang Ernst, this legislation "was relevant internationally since the Queen in Council was authorized to issue proclamations extending its operation" to the British possessions, and "marked the last stage in consolidating the sterling union".

==== Extradition Act 1870 ====
The Extradition Act 1870 defined the British possessions in its article 26:

The term "British possession" means any colony, plantation, island, territory, or settlement within Her Majesty's dominions, and not within the United Kingdom, the Channel Islands, and Isle of Man; and all colonies, plantations, islands, territories, and settlements under one legislature, as hereinafter defined, are deemed to be one British possession

— Extradition Act 1870, 26

The definition of "British possession" in the Extradition Act 1870 excluded the Channel Islands and the Isle of Man.

==== Slave Trade Act 1873 ====
The Slave Trade Act 1873 defined the British possessions in its article 2:

The term "British possession" means any plantation, territory, settlement, or place situate within Her Majesty's dominions, and not forming part of the United Kingdom

— Slave Trade Act 1873, 2

==== Fugitive Offenders Act 1881 ====
The Fugitive Offenders Act 1881 defined the British possessions in its section 39:

The expression "British possession" means any part of Her Majesty's dominions, exclusive of the United Kingdom, the Channel Islands, and Isle of Man; all territories and places within Her Majesty's dominions which are under one legislature shall be deemed to be one British possession and one part of Her Majesty's dominions

— Fugitive Offenders Act 1881, 39

According to Paul O'Higgins, "one of the most important of the legal ties linking the independent members of the British Commonwealth is the special procedure for intra-Commonwealth extradition embodied in the Fugitive Offenders Act, 1881", which "has survived the many changes which have taken place since then, in particular the attainment by the Commonwealth countries of full international personality". The law empowers the governor of a British possession to surrender a fugitive to the custody of another "if he thinks it just". According to the 1933 11th volume of the 2nd edition of Halsbury's Laws of England, citing a 1906 case, "the Commonwealth of Australia is not a British possession for this purpose, because the federal legislature has no power over the subject matter of that Act, so that Victoria must be reckoned still such a possession".

==== Post Office (Parcels) Act 1882 ====
The Post Office (Parcels) Act 1882 defined the British possessions in its section 17

The expression "British possession" does not include the Channel Islands or the Isle of Man, but includes all other territories and places forming part of Her Majesty's dominions

— Post Office (Parcels) Act 1882, 17

The definition of "British possession" in the Post Office (Parcels) Act 1882 excludes the Channel Islands and the Isles of Man, but does not exclude the United Kingdom itself. According to Roberts-Wray, this was "presumably by accident".

==== Patents, Designs, and Trade Marks Act 1883 ====
The Patents, Designs, and Trade Marks Act 1883 defined the British possessions in its section 117:

"British possession" means any territory or place situate within Her Majesty's dominions, and not being or forming part of the United Kingdom, or of the Channel Islands, or of the Isle of Man, and all territories and places under one legislature, as hereinafter defined, are deemed be one British possession for the purposes of this Act

— Patents, Designs, and Trade Marks Act 1883, 117

The definition of "British possession" in the Patents, Designs, and Trade Marks Act 1883 excluded the Channel Islands and the Isle of Man.

==== Colonial Prisoners Removal Act 1884 ====
The Colonial Prisoners Removal Act 1884 defined the British possessions in its section 18:

The expression "British possession" does not include any place within the United Kingdom, the Isle of Man, or the Channel Islands, but includes all other territories and places being part of Her Majesty's dominions, and all territories and places within Her Majesty's dominions which are not part of India and are under one legislature shall be deemed to be one British possession, and any part of India under a Governor or Lieutenant Governor shall be deemed to be one British possession.

— Colonial Prisoners Removal Act 1884, 18

The definition of "British possession" in the Colonial Prisoners Removal Act 1884 excluded the Channel Islands and the Isle of Man.

==== British Settlements Act 1887 ====
The British Settlements Act 1887 – which distinguished a particular category of British possession which had been "acquired by settlement" distinct from those "acquired by cession or conquest" – defined the British possessions in its article 6:

For the purposes of this Act, the expression "British possession" means any part of Her Majesty's possessions out of the United Kingdom, and the expression "British settlement" means any British possession which has not been acquired by cession or conquest, and is not for the time being within the jurisdiction of the Legislature, constituted otherwise than by virtue of this Act or of any Act repealed by this Act, of any British possession.

— British Settlements Act 1887, 6

As British possessions acquired without cession or conquest, Ascension Island, the British Antarctic Territory, the Falkland Islands, the Pitcairn Islands, South Georgia and the South Sandwich Islands, and Tristan da Cunha all take their statutory basis as British possessions and British settlements from the British Settlements Act 1887.

=== Later definitions ===
==== Colonial Probates Act 1892 ====
The Colonial Probates Act 1892 defined the British possessions in its section 4:

Where it appears to Her Majesty in Council that the legislature of part of a British possession has power to make the provision requisite for bringing this Act into operation in that part, it shall be lawful for Her Majesty to direct by Order in Council that this Act shall apply to that part as if it were a separate British possession, and thereupon, while the Order is in force, this Act shall apply accordingly.

— Colonial Probates Act 1892, 4.3

According to the 2009 13th volume of the 5th edition of Halsbury's Laws of England, the Colonial Probates Act 1892 is one of the acts in which "the term may include both the parts under the central legislature and those under the local legislatures", which differs from the definition in the Interpretation Act 1978.

==== General Clauses Act 1897 ====
In the law of India and the law of Pakistan, "British possession" is defined by the General Clauses Act 1897.

==== Medical Act (1886) Amendment Act 1905 ====
The Medical Act (1886) Amendment Act 1905 defined the British possessions in its section 1:

For the purposes of the Medical Act, 1886, where any part of a British possession is under a central and also under a local legislature, His Majesty may, if he thinks fit, by Order in Council, declare that the part which is under the local legislature shall be deemed a separate British possession.

— Medical Act (1886) Amendment Act 1905, 1

==== Evidence (Colonial Statutes) Act 1907 ====
In the reign of Edward VII (r. 1901–1910), the Evidence (Colonial Statutes) Act 1907 defined the British possessions in its article 1.3:

The expression "British possession" means any part of His Majesty's dominions exclusive of the United Kingdom, and, where parts of those dominions are under both a central and a local Legislature, shall include both all parts under the central Legislature and each part under a local Legislature.

— Evidence (Colonial Statutes) Act 1907, 1.3

As a result of the Evidence (Colonial Statutes) Act 1907, and unlike other overseas laws, statutes, books of authority, and legal decisions, such documents from the legislatures of British possessions may be submitted as evidence in courts in the United Kingdom without an expert to explain them, provided that they are printed by the government printer. According to Roberts-Wray, unlike the definition of "British possession" given in the Patents, Designs, and Trade Marks Act 1883 and the Interpretation Act 1889, the definition in the Evidence (Colonial Statutes) Act 1907 includes "component parts of a federation, such as the Canadian Provinces and the Australian States" – otherwise, the definition "may not fit in with the division of legislative powers". According to the 2009 13th volume of the 5th edition of Halsbury's Laws of England, the Evidence (Colonial Statutes) Act 1907 is one of the acts in which "the term may include both the parts under the central legislature and those under the local legislatures", which differs from the definition in the Interpretation Act 1978.

The Evidence (Colonial Statutes) Act 1907 applied to British Cyprus, even though Cyprus was a British protectorate, not a British possession. The text of the act made provision for the act's extension by an Order in Council to "Cyprus and any British protectorate, and where so extended this Act shall apply as if Cyprus or the protectorate were a British possession". The relevant Orders in Council, issued in 1909 and amended in 1922, extended the act to Cyprus and to the Bechuanaland Protectorate, the British Solomon Islands, Nigeria, Northern Rhodesia, the Northern Territories of the Gold Coast, Nyasaland, Somaliland, Southern Rhodesia, Swaziland, Uganda, and Zanzibar. According to the 2022 11th volume of Halsbury's Annotations, "The protectorates to which this Act was extended are now no longer protectorates, and Cyprus is now an independent republic but the Order in Council may still be relevant to the application of this Act to the Sovereign Base Areas of Akrotiri and Dhekelia which were retained when Cyprus became independent)."

=== Protectorates ===
The effect of the decision in R v Earl of Crewe, ex parte Sekgome (1910) was that British protectorates were not British possessions, they were foreign countries to which the Foreign Jurisdiction Act 1890 applied.

== Application ==
=== Admiralty law ===
In British admiralty law under the Merchant Shipping Act 1995, a "relevant British possession", includes the Crown Dependencies (the Isle of Man and the Channel Islands) and "any colony" (the self-governing British Overseas Territories). If a ship "is registered under the law of a relevant British possession", it may be classed as a "British ship". Accordingly, "The flag which every British ship is entitled to fly is the red ensign (without any defacement or modification)" but "in the case of British ships registered in a relevant British possession, any colours consisting of the red ensign defaced or modified whose adoption for ships registered in that possession is authorised". As defined by a statutory instrument of 2008, the "relevant British possessions" are:

According to the Merchant Shipping Act 1995, "The flag which every British ship is entitled to fly is the red ensign (without any defacement or modification)". British ships from "relevant British possessions" are entitled to fly modified or "defaced" versions of this flag.

- Anguilla
- Bermuda
- British Virgin Islands
- Cayman Islands
- Falkland Islands
- Gibraltar
- Guernsey
- Isle of Man
- Jersey
- Montserrat
- Saint Helena
- Turks and Caicos Islands

=== Copyright law ===
According to D. P. O'Connell, writing on the terms "British possession" and "Her Majesty's dominions" in The American Journal of International Law in 1964, "Where necessary, courts have construed these expressions to include territories which have gained republican status, but which have retained British legislation".

According to T. G. Agitha and N. S. Gopalakrishnan writing in 2013, in a copyright case in the Madras High Court before the introduction of the Indian Copyright Act, 1957, the defendant accused of violating copyright claimed that the Copyright Act 1911 (as modified by the Indian Copyright Act 1914) "being a law for the publishers of the UK, ceased to be operative in India when India became independent in 1947 and particularly after the country attained Republican status in January 1950, with the result that there was, at the relevant period, no copyright in India in published works". The defence had maintained "that under the terms of section 25 of the 1911 Act itself its provisions were inapplicable to self-governing dominions and when India attained the status of a self-governing dominion by reason of the Indian Independence Act 1947, the 1911 Act ceased to apply in India" According to O'Connell, the defence argued that "since India had ceased to be a "British possession" and copyright protection is reciprocally predicated upon original publication in a "British possession," the Act could not apply. The court rejected the defense". According to Agitha and Gopalakrishnan, the Madras High Court's judgement rejecting the defendant's arguments was "in line with the accepted view in international law that the emergence of a new state or a change of sovereignty within a state does not bring about any change in the private rights of its citizens or the law governing such rights".

=== Extradition law ===
In the law of South Africa, the status of the Union of South Africa as a "British possession" was tested in an extradition case disputing jurisdiction between the Union of South Africa and Basutoland. Since the British Fugitive Offenders Act 1881 stated that "Where two British possessions adjoin, a person accused of an offence committed on or within the distance of five hundred yards from the common boundary of such possessions may be apprehended, tried, and punished in either of such possessions", a court in Mohale's Hoek claimed jurisdiction to try the case of defendant whose crime was alleged to have been committed in South Africa, but within 500 yards (460 m) of the Basutoland border. Having been convicted, the defence appealed, arguing that a Basutoland court had no jurisdiction because the Union of South Africa was not a "British possession" under the Status of the Union Act, 1934, which, following the Statute of Westminster 1931, had made South Africa a sovereign state. The court dismissed the appeal on the grounds that the Union of South Africa was indeed a "British possession", and that the Fugitive Offenders Act 1881 applied. In 1937, W. P. M. Kennedy, commenting on this case in the University of Toronto Law Journal, suggested that the Dominion of Canada might have ceased to be a "British possession", writing that 'since, under the Statute of Westminster, Dominions are no longer colonies "notwithstanding anything in the Interpretation Act, 1889", it is submitted that they are no longer "British possession"', but admitting that 'the point is arguable'.

The Fugitive Offenders Act 1881 ceased to apply to the Union of Burma and the Republic of Ireland when those countries withdrew from the Commonwealth. Under the Ireland Act 1949, British laws which previously extended to the Irish Free State as part of "His Majesty's dominions" continued to apply to the Republic of Ireland, but the same was not true of those which applied to British possessions, even though under the Interpretation Act the British possessions are defined as being "any part of Her Majesty's dominions outside the United Kingdom". According to Roberts-Wray, "If that had been the intention it would have been made clear; the saving provision in the Ireland Act operates, it is submitted, only on direct references to Her Majesty's dominions and not, via the Interpretation Act, on references to British possession".

In the law of India, the Supreme Court of India determined in 1954 that relevant provisions of the Fugitive Offenders Act 1881 did not apply to India, as India had ceased to be a British possession on adoption of the republican Constitution of India in 1950. According to Paul O'Higgins writing for The International and Comparative Law Quarterly in 1960: "From the point of view, however, of United Kingdom courts the Act still applies in relation to India. This is because of the India (Consequential Provisions) Act, 1949, which provided for the continued application of existing law in relation to India, notwithstanding its new status as a Republic."

Writing in The American Journal of International Law in 1964, D. P. O'Connell noted that, under the Fugitive Offenders Act 1881, "rendition has been successfully claimed by or from India, Pakistan, Ghana, Cyprus, Nigeria and the United Kingdom, and by Australia in Ceylon, without the defense being successful that, in virtue of independence, the Act could no longer apply". According to O'Connell: "However, it must be noticed that, at the time of rendition, Pakistan, Nigeria and Ceylon were still monarchies, and the United Kingdom statutorily maintained the Fugitive Offenders Act in relation to India and Cyprus".

New Zealand ceased to be a British possession after adoption of the New Zealand Constitution Amendment Act 1973, which modified the provisions of the Statute of Westminster Adoption Act 1947. For example, in 1976 the unreported case of Re Ashman and Best held that the country was not a "British possession" for extradition purposes, notwithstanding the application of the UK Fugitive Offenders Act 1881 to British possessions. The New Zealand Parliament later passed the Constitution Act 1986, which ended the power of the Parliament of the United Kingdom to legislate for New Zealand.

=== Criminal law ===
The question of British possession status arose in the 2004 Pitcairn Islands sexual assault trial. A number of men on the Pitcairn Islands were accused of sexual offences and prosecuted under British statutes. Because the islands had been founded by mutineers from HMS Bounty and lightly administered by the British, including a period of administration by Fiji prior to its independence, the defendants on appeal raised the question as to whether Pitcairn Islanders were British subjects liable to prosecution under British law. The Privy Council denied the appeal, having found Pitcairn to be a British possession under the British Settlements Act 1887, which had been extended to the Pacific by an order in council in 1893 and to Pitcairn in particular in 1898 by the Secretary of State for the Colonies, Joseph Chamberlain.

Delivering the judgment, Lord Hoffman spoke of the "legal status of the Pitcairns as a British possession". Lord Wolff said " In my view the evidence that Pitcairn is and was at all relevant times a British possession was overwhelming and so I agree with Lord Hoffmann, that for the purposes of determining these appeals, it is not necessary to explore the limits of the act of state doctrine".

According to Gordon Woodman, "In the case of Pitcairn the starting-point for argument was the proposition that the territory was a British possession". In 1790 Pitcairn was terra nullius, and according to Andrew Lewis "Once a British possession, it would require a deliberate act of abandonment or cession to another to change its status". According to Dino Kritsiotis and A. W. B. Simpson, "the finer legal points as to the actual timing or moment of territorial acquisition were not regarded as essential to, or determinative of, the prosecution's case".

=== Nationality law ===
From 1867, Chinese people born in a British possession, together with their children, were one of four categories of people classed as "Anglo-Chinese" and entitled to a degree of British protection by agreement with the Qing dynasty.

In the first three decades of the 20th century, naturalization in the British Empire was governed by the Naturalization Act 1870 (33 & 34 Vict. c. 14) and by a report circulated at the 1902 Colonial Conference, which sought to establish a common standard of naturalization to be recognized throughout the empire for both internal and external purposes. The interdepartmental report allowed "a Secretary of State, or the Governor of a British possession, to confer the status of a British subject upon persons who fulfil the requisite conditions in any part of the British Dominions".
