= Michael Mustill, Baron Mustill =

English barrister and judge (1931–2015)

The Right Honourable The Lord Mustill PC FBA

Lord of Appeal in Ordinary
- In office 10 January 1992 – 21 March 1997
- Monarch: Elizabeth II
- Preceded by: The Lord Oliver of Aylmerton
- Succeeded by: The Lord Saville of Newdigate

Member of the House of Lords
- Lord Temporal
- Lord of Appeal in Ordinary; 10 January 1992 – 24 April 2015

Personal details
- Born: Michael John Mustill; 10 May 1931
- Died: 24 April 2015 (aged 83) Pateley Bridge, Nidderdale, Harrogate, North Yorkshire, England, UK
- Spouses: Beryl Davies (m. 1960; div. 1983); Caroline Phillips (m. 1984)
- Children: Two sons; one stepdaughter
- Education: St John's College, Cambridge
- Occupation: Judge
- Profession: Law

Michael John Mustill, Baron Mustill, PC, FBA (10 May 1931 – 24 April 2015) was an English barrister and judge. He was a Lord of Appeal in Ordinary from 1992 to 1997.

== Life and career ==
The son of Clement William and Marion Mustill, he was educated at Oundle School and St John's College, Cambridge, where he graduated with a Doctor of Laws in 1992. He served in the Royal Artillery from 1949 to 1951, was called to the Bar, Gray's Inn in 1955, became a Queen's Counsel in 1968 and a Bencher in 1976. Mustill was Deputy Chairman of the Hampshire Quarter Sessions in 1971. He was made Chairman of the Civil Service Appeal Tribunal in 1971 and Recorder of the Crown Court in 1972, holding both posts until 1978, when he was knighted.

Mustill was a judge of the High Court, Queen's Bench Division from 1978 to 1985 and Presiding Judge, North Eastern Circuit from 1981 to 1984. From 1985 he was Chairman of the Judicial Studies Board until 1989, Chairman of the Departmental Committee on Law of Arbitration until 1990, and Lord Justice of Appeal from 1985 to 1992. On 10 January 1992, he was appointed Lord of Appeal in Ordinary and in consequence created a life peer as Baron Mustill, of Pateley Bridge in the County of North Yorkshire. In 1997, he retired as Lord of Appeal.

Lord Mustill married twice, firstly in 1960 to Beryl Davies, they divorced in 1983; and secondly to Caroline Phillips in 1984, with whom he had two sons and one stepdaughter. He was Honorary President of the Cambridge University Law Society.

== Notable judgments ==
- Jaggard v Dickinson [1981] QB 527
- Atlantic Lines and Navigation Co Inc v Hallam Ltd, The Lucy [1983] 1 Lloyd's Rep. 188
- Lombard North Central Plc v Laurence Arthur Butterworth [1987] QB 527
- R v Millard and Vernon [1987] Crim LR 393
- R v Brown [1993] 2 All ER 75 (Dissenting)
- White v Jones [1995] AC 207 (Dissenting)
- R v Secretary of State for the Home Department, ex parte Fire Brigades Union [1995] 2 AC 513 (Dissenting)
- Ruxley Electronics and Construction Ltd v Forsyth [1996] AC 344
- The Nagasaki Spirit [1997] 1 Lloyds Rep 323
- Attorney General's Reference No.3 (1994) [1998] AC 245
- R v Powell [1999] 1 AC 1

== See also ==
- Operation Spanner

== Sources ==
- "DodOnline". Archived from the original on 7 December 2006.
