= Wreck Removal Convention Act 2011 =

United Kingdom law

- Act of Parliament
- Parliament of the United Kingdom
- Long title: An Act to implement the Nairobi International Convention on the Removal of Wrecks 2007.
- Citation: 2011 c. 8
- Introduced by: Thérèse Coffey (Commons); Baroness Stowell of Beeston (Lords)

Dates
- Royal assent: 12 July 2011
- Commencement: 5 February 2015 in part 14 April 2015 in full

Status: Current legislation

Text of statute as originally enacted

Text of the Wreck Removal Convention Act 2011 as in force today (including any amendments) within the United Kingdom, from legislation.gov.uk.

The Wreck Removal Convention Act 2011 (c. 8) is an act of the Parliament of the United Kingdom. The act made provisions for the ratification of the Nairobi International Convention on the Removal of Wrecks.

== Legislative passage ==
The act was passed as a private members' bill. John Gummer had tried to introduce similar legislation for many years but had not been succesfful.

== Provisions ==
The act amends the Merchant Shipping Act 1995 to include the text of the Nairobi International Convention on the Removal of Wrecks and implement the decisions made there.

The provisions of the inserted amendment include:

=== Wreck reports ===
- Making it the responsibility of any United Kingdom ship to report any accident in a Convention area resulting in a wreck "without delay".
- If the wreck is in the UK's waters, it must be reported to the Secretary of State. Otherwise, it must be reported to the government in whose waters it has been wrecked.
- Making the master and operator responsible for their ships.
- Making it the duty of those responsible for their ship to file a report with the information included in paragraph (2) of Section 5 of the Wrecks Convention (namely, the precise location of the wreck; the type, size and construction of the wreck; the nature of the damage to and the condition of the wreck; the nature and quantity of the cargo, in particular any hazardous or noxious substances; and the amount and types of oil, including bunker oil and lubricating oil on board).
- Making it an offence to not comply with the reporting requirement (a person guilty of this offence is liable to, on summary conviction, a fine of up to £50,000 or on conviction on indictment, to a fine).

=== Locating and marking wrecks ===
- Making it the duty of the Secretary of State to, if there is a wreck within UK waters, comply with Sections 7 and 8 of the Wrecks Convention (namely, using all practicable means to warn mariners and other States concerned of the nature and location of the wreck as a matter of urgency; and if the wreck is deemed a hazard, ensuring all reasonable steps are taken to mark it).
- Allowing the Secretary of State to direct any general lighthouse authority, harbour authority or conservancy authority to take specified steps in relation to a wreck if it is in their area.

- Any such direction must be in writing or if it is not reasonably practicable to give in writing, must be confirmed in writing as soon as possible.
- Any authority to whom a direction is given must comply with it.

=== Removal by designated owner ===
- If an accident results in a wreck which the Secretary of State has deemed a hazard, the Secretary of State must take all reasonable steps to give a wreck removal notice - a notice requiring the registered owner to comply with the obligations set out in paragraphs 2 and 3 of Section 9 of the Wrecks Convention (namely, that the registered owner must removed any wreck deemed a hazard and that the owner should provide the competent authority [here the Secretary of State] with evidence of insurance and financial security that is required by the Convention).

- Any wreck removal notice must be in writing and specify a deadline for the removal of the wreck and inform the owner of the matters set out in paragraph 6(b) and (c) of Section 9 of the Wrecks Convention (namely that if the owner does not remove the wreck within the deadline, the government will remove it at their expense and that the government will intervene immediately if the wreck becomes a severe hazard).

- Making it an offence to not comply with a wreck removal notice without reasonable excuse (a person guilty of this offence is liable to, on summary conviction, a fine of up to £50,000 or on conviction on indictment, to a fine).

=== Imposition of conditions about removal ===
- If the Secretary of State serves a wreck removal notice, allowing them to impose extra conditions to the removal as under paragraph 4 of Section 9 of the Wrecks Convention.

- Such conditions are made in writing in the wreck removal notice.

- Making it an offence to not comply with any conditions (a person guilty of this offence is liable to, on summary conviction, a fine of up to £50,000 or on conviction on indictment, to a fine).

== Commencement ==
The act came into force through the Wreck Removal Convention Act 2011 (Commencement) Order 2015 (SI 2015/133). The order made provisions that select parts of Section 1 should come into force on 5 February 2015. The rest of the act came into force on 14 April 2015.
