= International Convention on Salvage =

1989 treaty on maritime assistance and salvage

The International Convention on Salvage is a treaty that was concluded in London on 28 April 1989 that replaced the Brussels Convention on Assistance and Salvage at Sea as the principal multilateral document governing marine salvage.

The Convention's main innovation is that the scope of salvage law has been extended to cover "environmental salvage".

== "No cure, no pay" and environmental salvage ==
The 1910 Brussels Convention had established the principle (known as "no cure, no pay") that a salvor is rewarded only if the salvage operation successfully rescues the ship or its cargo. The International Convention on Salvage expanded on this principle by introducing the concept of an "enhanced salvage award", which may be awarded by an arbitrator or a tribunal if the salvor took effective action to prevent or minimize environmental damage but nevertheless failed to salvage the ship or its cargo.

The 1989 Convention entered into force on 14 July 1996 and as of April 2016 has been ratified by 69 states representing 52 percent of the gross tonnage of the world’s merchant fleet. The impetus for the new Convention was the LOF 1980 which permitted salvage rewards to be made to salvors who acted to limit damage to the coastal environment after oil spills.

Articles 13 & 14 of the Convention made provision for "Special Compensation", but The Nagasaki Spirit case revealed that the Convention had been poorly drafted and, rather than encouraging environmental salvors, instead it limited the amount that such salvors could be paid to mere "out-of-pocket expenses", with no allowance for any profit margin. This deficiency has since been addressed by the SCOPIC codicil to the LOF.

== See also ==
- P&I Clubs
