= Tripping line =

On a boat, a tripping line is small rope attached to the topgallant or royal yard, used to trip the yard and lower it to the deck. It's also a line used in releasing the anchor.
