= Lloyd's Open Form =

Contract for marine salvage

The Lloyd's Open Form, formally "Lloyd's Standard Form of Salvage Agreement", and commonly referred to as the LOF, is a standard form contract for a proposed marine salvage operation. Originating in the late 19th century, the form is published by Lloyd's of London and is the most commonly used form for international salvage. (Note: There are several recent versions of the LOF: 1980, 1990, 1995, 2000, 2010) Innovations in the LOF 1980 have engendered a major change in environmental salvage.

== The salvage reward ==
After a stricken ship accepts an offer of salvage from a salvor, a binding contract is created. It is then normal to agree upon the LOF in the interests of certainty of terms. The LOF is called "open" because it specifies no particular sum for the salvage job. Indeed it may not specify a sum, as salvage is not a "contract for services", but an agreement to provide a service in the hope of a "reward" to be determined later by an arbitration hearing in London, where several KCs practising at the Admiralty Bar specialise as maritime arbitrators.

When determining the salvage award, an arbitrator follows the English law of civil salvage, which is itself subject to the Salvage Convention 1989, a successor to the original 1910 Convention. The value of the ship, its cargo and freight at risk are taken into account when the arbitrator decides what the award should be, together with the extent of the dangers and the difficulty in effecting the salvage.

=== "No cure – no pay" ===
Traditionally, the salvage reward has been subject to the salvor successfully saving the ship or cargo, and if neither is saved, the salvor gets nothing, however much time and money has been spent on the project. This harsh principle is called "No cure – no pay"; and at the top of page one of the LOF, beneath the title "Salvage Agreement" is a statement of this fundamental premise.

=== Modern environmental salvage ===
In the 1960s and 1970s, there were a number of ageing single-skinned tankers (Note: See double-hulled tanker.) coming to grief and letting huge slicks of crude oil escape. (Note: Casualties included the Torrey Canyon, the Amoco Cadiz, and the Exxon Valdez .) While passing ships were obliged to offer reasonable assistance to save life, they were reluctant to offer salvage services on a seeming reckless adventure to save a low value hulk where third party liability risks might be enormous. Instead, salvors preferred to work where there were richer pickings and fewer dangers. This situation alarmed coastal states (whose beaches were liable to pollution from oil slicks) and P&I clubs (who might be responsible to indemnify those third-party risks).

To remedy the position, the Lloyd's Open Form (LOF) 1980 made provision for a stricken tanker to engage salvage services and guarantee a reward provided that the salvor had exercised due diligence in attempting to save the marine environment from pollution. This innovation proved very successful, and the international community was so delighted and impressed that only a few years later the 1989 Salvage Convention came into force, adopting this new LOF idea. Specifically, articles 13 and 14 of the Convention lay down the modern basis for making the award. (Note: The Salvage Convention 1989 is now incorporated into the UK's Merchant Shipping Act 1995) (Note: The "marine environment" being protected is purely "coastal"; mid-oceanic pollution is not catered for.)

Although the 1989 Convention has been a success, the House of Lords decision in The Nagasaki Spirit showed that it had been poorly drafted in places, and did not always provide adequate reimbursement to salvors. The international maritime industry joined with P&I Clubs in 2000 to develop the new SCOPIC form, (Note: SCOPIC - an acronym for "Special Compensation - P&I Clubs") a codicil which could be annexed to the LOF to redress the shortcomings of the 1989 Convention.
