= Brussels Convention on Assistance and Salvage at Sea =

International convention on maritime assistance and salvage

Brussels Convention for the Unification of Certain Rules with Respect to Assistance and Salvage at Sea
- Type: International convention
- Signed: 23 September 1910
- Location: Brussels, Belgium

The Brussels Convention for the Unification of Certain Rules with Respect to Assistance and Salvage at Sea (French: Convention pour l'unification de certaines règles en matiere assistance et de sauvetage maritimes) is a treaty on marine salvage that was concluded on 23 September 1910, in Brussels, Belgium.

As of 2013, the convention remains in force in over 70 states. The states that have denounced the convention after accepting it are Canada, Croatia, Denmark, Germany, Iran, Netherlands, New Zealand, Norway, Spain, and Sweden.

The Brussels Convention forms the basis of current international marine salvage law. The Convention was amended by a Protocol issued in Brussels on 27 May 1967. However, the Brussels Convention has been overridden in some countries by the 1989 International Convention on Salvage, which took effect in 1996. Some states that have ratified the 1989 Convention have denounced the 1910 Convention.

== See also ==
- United Nations Convention on the Law of the Sea
- Marine salvage
