= Nairobi International Convention on the Removal of Wrecks =

2007 treaty

The Nairobi International Convention on the Removal of Wrecks is a 2007 treaty of the International Maritime Organization (IMO).

The purpose of the convention is to establish uniform rules for the prompt and effective removal of shipwrecks located in the exclusive economic zone (EEZ) of a state that may be hazardous to navigation or to the environment. The convention gives states authority to remove wrecks from the portion of its EEZ that is within international waters without any implication that the state is claiming sovereignty over that area.

The convention was concluded at Nairobi, Kenya, on 18 May 2007. It entered into force on 14 April 2015 after being ratified by ten states.

== States parties ==
As of November 2018, the convention has been ratified by 41 states.

Countries ratified Convention
Country	Date of ratification	Note
Indonesia	20 July 2020	
Russia	25 November 2021 (Note: Only lower chamber (Gosduma) has ratified that law. It has to be passed by senate and signed president.)	Lower-chamber only
