= Stonefish (mine) =

- Type: Mine
- Place of origin: United Kingdom

Production history
- Manufacturer: BAE Systems
- Variants: 4 Warshot has an incremental payload.

Specifications
- Diameter: 533 mm (21.0 in)
- Warhead: aluminised PBX

Stonefish is a naval influence mine manufactured by British defence company BAE Systems. There has been conjecture that South Africa, Chile, Iraq, Libya and possibly other countries may have gained access to either some early Stonefish information or to similar technology. The mine is named after the venomous stonefish.

In 2000, the Stonefish Mk III mine was selected under Project 2045 Phase 1A for the Royal Australian Navy and the Royal Australian Air Force, however, the project was cancelled, with reportedly around 20 training mines delivered.

== Design ==
Stonefish mines generally have two suspension lugs in order to facilitate handling operations e.g. winching. They can be deployed by fixed-wing aircraft, helicopters, surface vessels and submarines. It is a cylindrically shaped, modular weapon, comprising three separate sections which are joined together to form one unit:

- launching system (e.g. nose fairing, tail-fin unit, parachute-pack and arming lanyards for air-dropped delivery)
- electronics pack (incorporating safety/arming devices, target processing computer and associated fuze mechanisms)
- aluminised PBX high explosive warhead

== Versions ==
There are four different versions of the Stonefish mine, only one of which is intended for use in combat. The other three versions are intended for training or target acquisition purposes. These are:

- Warstock mine. Used in combat. Contains an explosive warhead. Incorporates acoustic, magnetic and pressure sensors, coupled with computerised electronics to provide target assessment i.e. whether the target is genuine, whether it is regarded as a legitimate enemy target, and whether it lies within the destructive blast radius of the warhead. Detonation will only be triggered when all three criteria have been met.
- Drill practice mine. A low-cost training version which does not contain any explosives. It is used to teach operators the drills and procedures required for optimum handling, transportation, fuze programming and preparation. This enables warstock mines to be used in combat with the maximum operational effectiveness.
- Assessment mine. To all intents and purposes a naval SIGINT device, used to gather ship target signature data to update target characteristics and assist with programming. The assessment mine is used on the sea bed and does not contain any explosives. A shore station, which also contains simulation and analysis software, controls the mines via a data link cable.
- Exercise mine. Used on naval exercises. It incorporates the same electronic sensors and software as a warstock mine, but does not contain any explosives. The electronic circuitry records the acoustic, magnetic and pressure influences of a target and provides users with an indication that the mine (were it warstock) would have detonated. An acoustic telemetry link controls the unit after deployment and commands the recovery process.

== Employment parameters ==
Two sizes of Stonefish explosive warhead are available for warstock mines, 100 kilograms (220 lb) and 300 kilograms (660 lb). However, the destructive power of a Stonefish mine can be adjusted by coupling multiple warheads together in different combinations. In this way, a Stonefish mine can have a warhead which weighs 100, 200, 300, 400, 500 or 600 kg. The ability to change the warhead size allows Stonefish to be deployed against small targets in shallow coastal waters or against large targets in deep ocean. Depending on the warhead configuration, a Stonefish mine can have a total weight of up to 990 kilograms (2,180 lb). The physical measurements of a Stonefish mine are such that it can easily be loaded into the torpedo tubes of submarines, then deployed using a small charge of compressed air to expel it. Alternatively, if an optional air-drop kit is fitted it can also be deployed by maritime patrol aircraft such as the P-3 Orion (connected to the aircraft via suspension lugs and an arming lanyard) its descent to the ocean surface slowed by a parachute retard pack.

The computerised exploder in a Stonefish mine is microprocessor-based. It features acoustic, magnetic and water pressure displacement target detection sensors. The DSP circuitry includes such features as the ability to set thresholds regarding the signal strength and adjust sterilisation delay times (how long before the mine renders itself inoperative). A portable electronic presetting kit can be used to reprogram the mine (e.g. uploading a new library of acoustic target signatures or increasing the arming delay from one hour to 10 days) before the mine is deployed.

The operating depth of Stonefish ranges between 30 and 200 metres (98 and 656 ft). Its shelf life is 20 years, and it has an operational lifetime of 700 days after being deployed on the seabed. Stonefish incorporates arming delays, ship counting and self-sterilisation features which can be configured by the user.
