= Singer (naval mine) =

Naval mine deployed by the Confederacy during the American Civil War

The Singer was a naval mine made and deployed by the Confederacy during the American Civil War. It was a manually laid moored contact mine.

== Development ==
During the American Civil War, Matthew Fontaine Maury, a Confederate government official established the Torpedo Bureau and the Torpedo Corps in Richmond, Virginia to oversee the development and deployment of new types of naval mines. Maury was convinced that the only way to defend the coastlines against Union assaults was through the widespread use of naval mines. Mines were inexpensive and easily produced on a large scale. The low cost and large volume of mines produced would supplement the small naval forces of the Confederacy and make it possible to defend against the superior fleet of the Union navy. The efforts of the Torpedo Bureau and the Torpedo Corps proved to be worth the investment of the Confederacy. For the relative low cost of the mines they did a tremendous amount of damage to the Union forces, sinking a total of 27 Union naval vessels.

== Features ==
The most successful naval mine of the Confederacy is known as the ‘Singer’ mine, so-called because it was invented by a member of the family which owned and operated the Singer Corporation. The ‘Singer’ was a manually laid moored contact mine; it was set off when struck by an object with sufficient force to trigger the automatic fuse. The body of the mine was made from sheets of iron and was filled with a charge of 55-65 pounds of gunpowder. The automatic fuse consisted of a heavy metal cap that would be released by the force of a ship impacting it. As the cap was released it triggered a spring mechanism that struck a fulminating charge, in the form of a percussion cap, which detonated the main explosive. It was one of the first mines equipped with a safety mechanism to prevent an accidental explosion. While being handled and during the planting of the mine a safety pin prevented the spring from accidentally triggering the fulminating charge. This pin was removed after the mine was in position. The only major drawback of the ‘Singer’ was that the spring mechanism was exposed to the water. When deployed in salt water sea growth would eventually develop on the spring mechanism, effectively preventing it from striking the fulminating charge within the mine. This flaw in the design caused Confederate minefields, especially in tropical waters, to become inert after a period of time.
