= Way of the Lighthouses =

Hiking trail in Galicia, Spain

The Lighthouse Way; Camiño dos Faros (Galician); Camino de los Faros (Spanish); Caminho dos Farois (Portuguese)
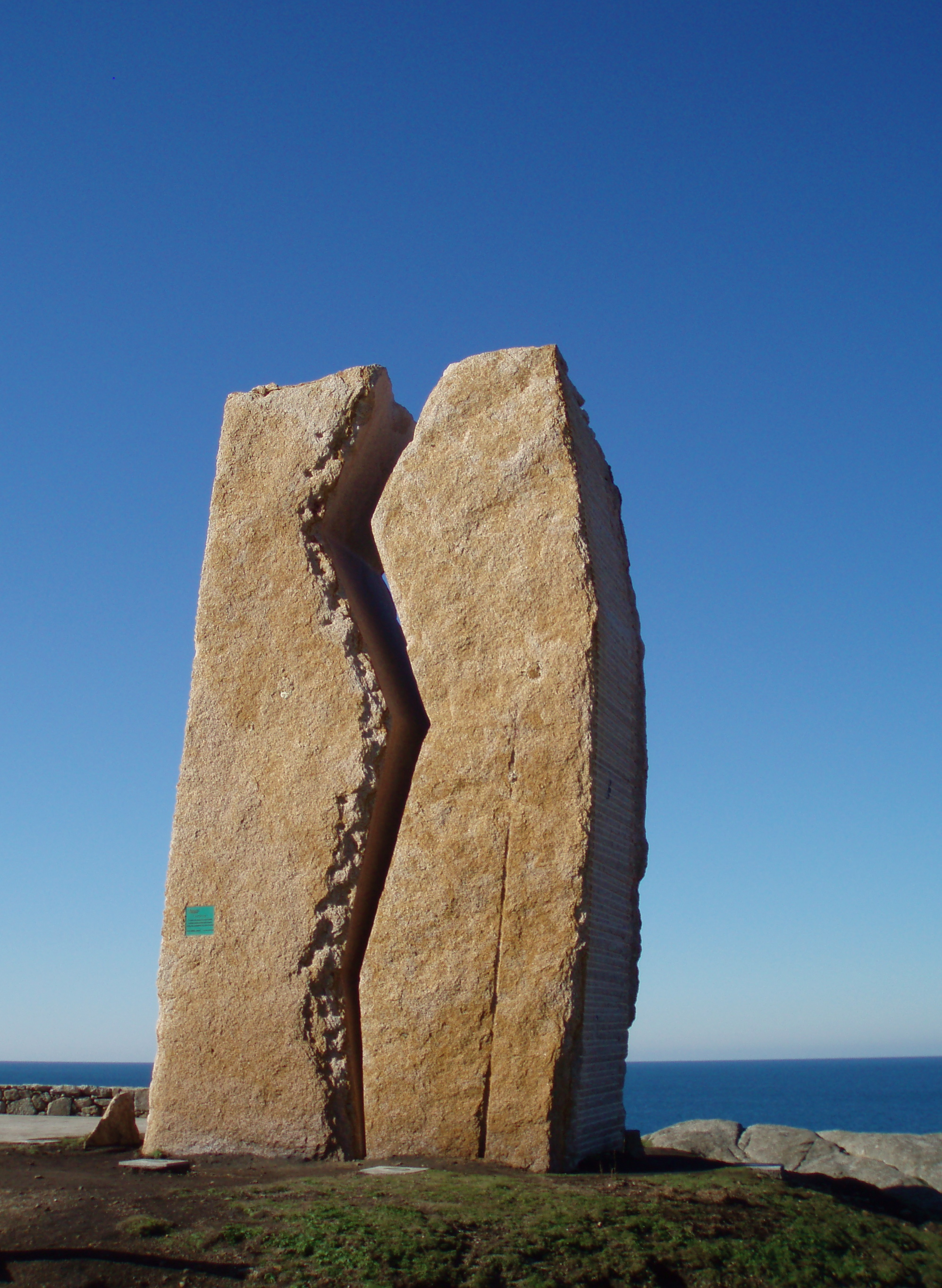
- "A Ferida" (The Wound) sculpture by Alberto Bañuelos
- Length: 200 kilometres (120 mi)
- Location: Galicia, Spain
- Trailheads: Malpica and Finisterre
- Use: Hiking, backpacking
- Highest point: Castelo, Loureiro
- Lowest point: Atlantic Ocean, 0 ft (0 m)
- Difficulty: Easy to strenuous
- Maintainer: Camiño dos Faros Association
- Website: Official website

The Way of the Lighthouses, or the Lighthouse Way (Galician: Camiño dos Faros, Spanish: Camino de los Faros) is a 200 kilometres (120 mi) hiking trail along the Costa da Morte ('Coast of Death') in the province of A Coruña, Galicia, Spain. It joins Malpica with Finisterre along the coastline linking the lighthouses and landmarks along the way. The name of the route refers to the numerous lighthouses built on the Costa da Morte during the 19th and 20th centuries to make navigation safer.

The route is divided into eight segments, averaging 26 kilometres (16 mi). The shortest segment is from Laxe to Arou which measures 17.7 kilometres (11.0 mi), while the longest is from Camariñas to Muxía which measures 32.6 kilometres (20.3 mi). From north to south, on its way from Malpica to Fisterra the trail passes through the municipalities of Malpica, Fisterra, Ponteceso, Cabana de Bergantiños, Laxe, Arou, Vimianzo, Camariñas, Muxía and Cee.

Small crosses along the coast memorialize drowned gatherers (Spanish: percebeiros) of goose barnacles (Spanish: percebe gallego), and are a reminder of how dangerous this stretch of coast is, both for local fishermen and sailors on longer voyages. In addition to the lighthouses, other reminders of the different tragedies that occurred in this area include the English Cemetery, which contains the remains of English sailors shipwrecked at the end of the 19th century, as well as the occasional remains of ships and cargo giving rise to the names of beaches, rocks, shoals, etc. The most dramatic monument is La Ferida, a sculpture located in Muxía facing the Atlantic Ocean, on a hill next to the Virxe da Barca sanctuary, commemorating the 2002 Prestige oil spill.

== Background ==
In December 2012, a group of Galician hikers decided to go for a hike along the seashore, from Malpica to Fisterra, taking advantage of the paths that had been opened by fishermen and barnacle gatherers (Spanish: percebeiros); a journey of 200 kilometres (120 mi) around the northwest coast of Galicia that took several weeks to complete. They wanted to create a route that stayed as close to the sea as possible. From that small start, the popularity of the trail has grown.

The non-profit "Camiño dos Faros Association" is working to formalize the entire route.

== Stages ==
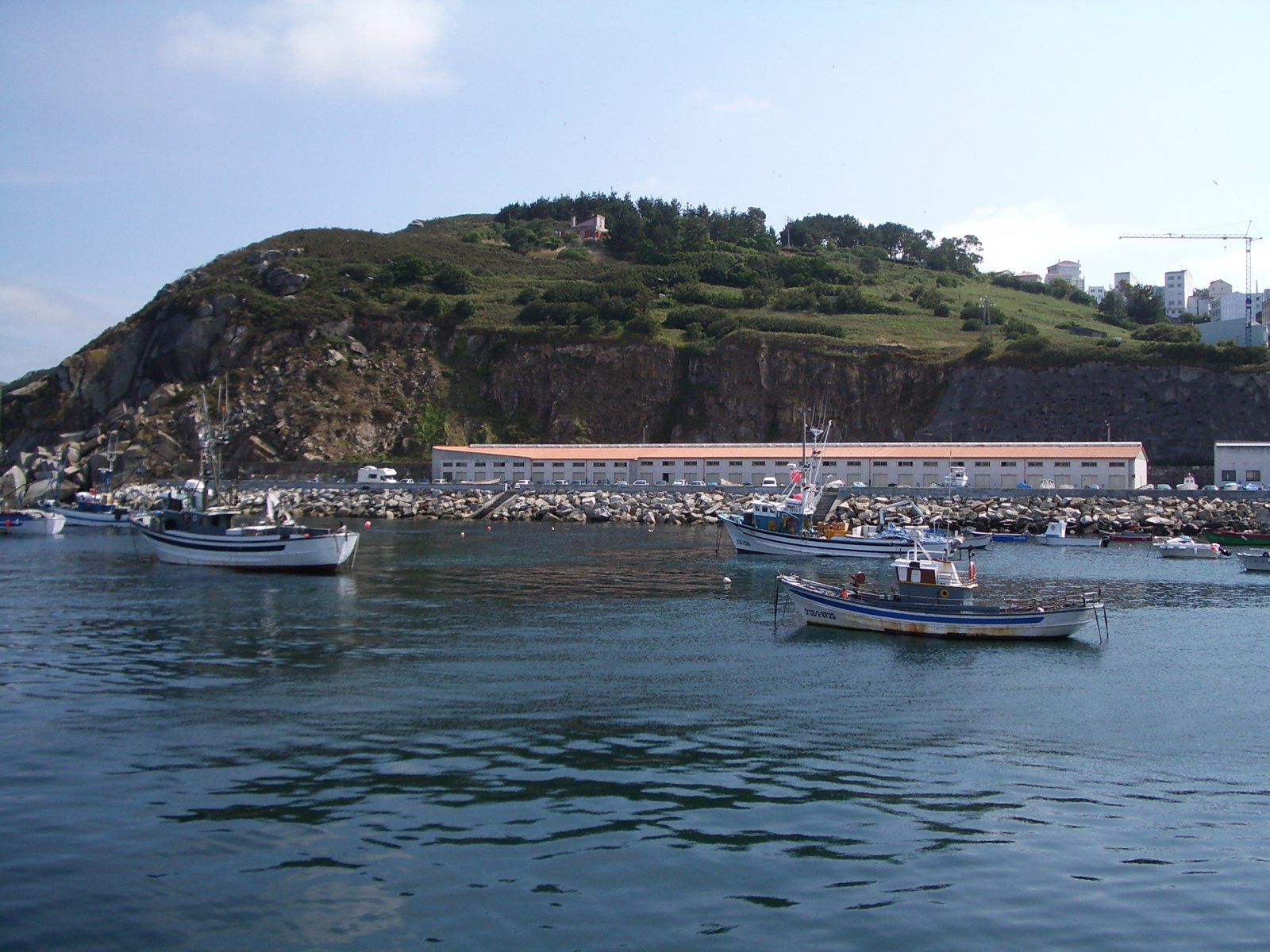
Porto de Malpica, starting point for the Camiño dos Faros

The trail is designed for each stage (each stage corresponds to one day of walking) to be easily broken up based on the hikers pace. Six of the eight stages follow a mixture of paths that pass by cliffs and beaches, while the other two head inland, circumnavigating the estuaries of Corme e Laxe estuary and Camariñas along what they are two stretches of very jagged coast. The stages start and finish in small fishing villages with plenty of accommodation options.

From north to south:

Stage 1 Malpica–Niñóns

This first stage starts at the port of Malpica and ends at Niñóns beach.

Stage 2 Niñons–Ponteceso

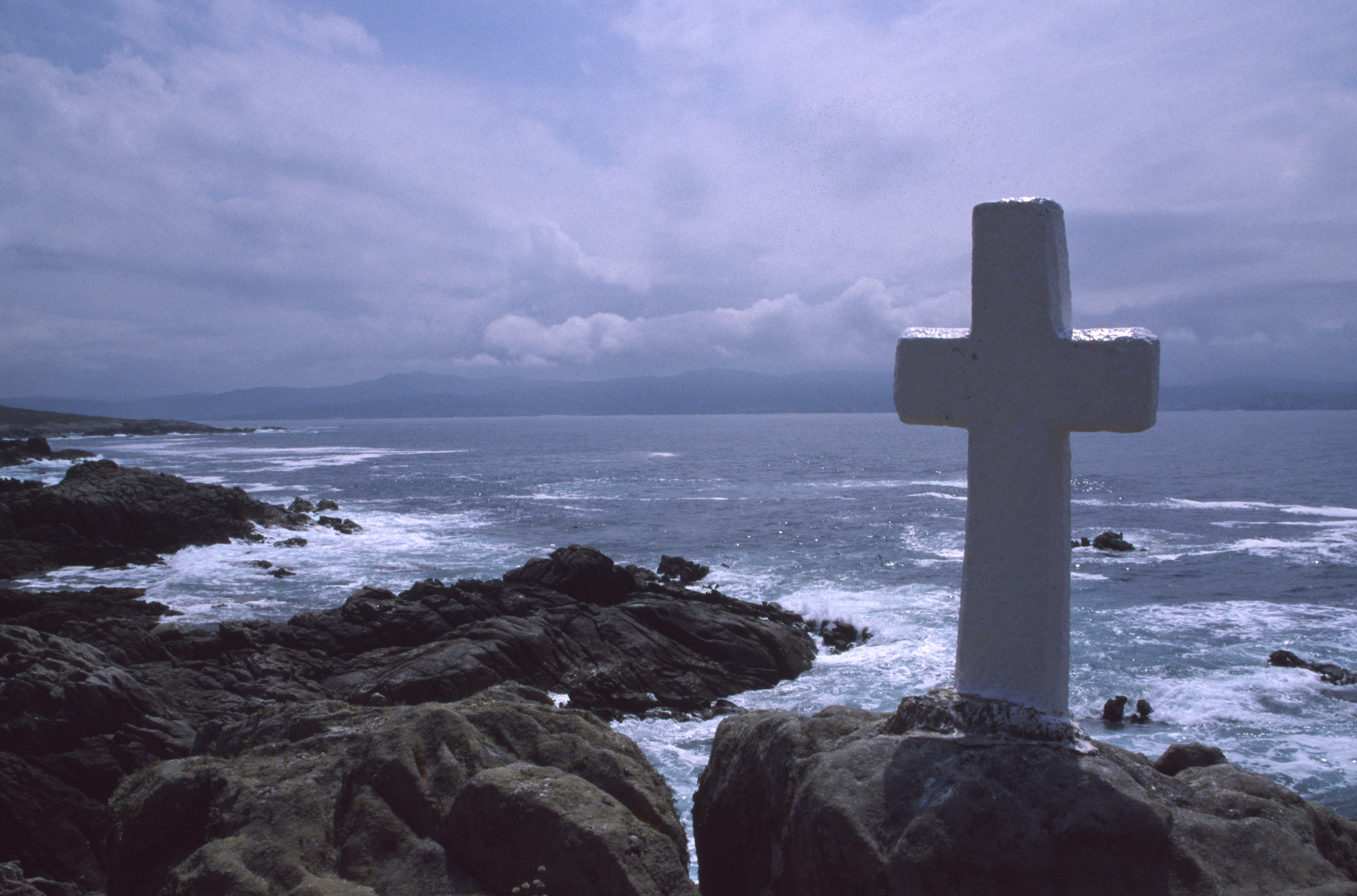
Cape Roncudo

The second stage begins on the beach of Niñones and after 27.1 kilometres (16.8 mi) ends in Ponteceso, next to the house where writer of the Galician hymn,Os Pinos, Eduardo Pondal, was born, and the bridge that connects Ponteceso and Cabana de Bergantiños over the Anllóns river. This stage takes place in its entirety through the municipality of Ponteceso.

Stage 3 Ponteceso–Laxe

The third stage is 25.3 kilometres (15.7 mi) and starts at the bridge of Ponteceso, ending at the port of Laxe. Most of this stage passes through the municipality of Cabana de Bergantiños where the high point of the trail is located. Castelo, Loureiro sits at 312 metres (1,024 ft) above sea level.

Stage 4 Laxe–Arou

At 18 kilometres (11 mi), the fourth stage is the shortest segment of the Camiño, starts at the port of Laxe and ends at Arou beach. This stage takes place in the municipalities of Laxe, Vimianzo and Camariñas.

Stage 5 Arou–Camariñas

The fifth stage is 23.8 kilometres (14.8 mi) in length and starts at the beach of Arou and ends at the port of Camariñas. This stage takes place in its entirety through the municipality of Camariñas.

Stage 6 Camariñas–Muxía

The sixth stage starts at the port of Camariñas and ends at Coido beach in Muxía after traveling 32.6 kilometres (20.3 mi), a distance that makes this the longest and flattest stage of the Camino dos Faros. This stage runs through the municipalities of Camariñas, Vimianzo and Muxía and has two distinct parts: one from Camariñas to Ponte do Porto and the other from Ponte do Porto to Muxía.

Stage 7 Muxía–Nemiña

The seventh stage starts at Coido beach in Muxía and ends at the beach in the parish of Nemiña, Muxía, after traveling 25.3 kilometres (15.7 mi). This stage takes place in the municipality of Muxía.

Stage 8 Nemiña–Cape Finisterre

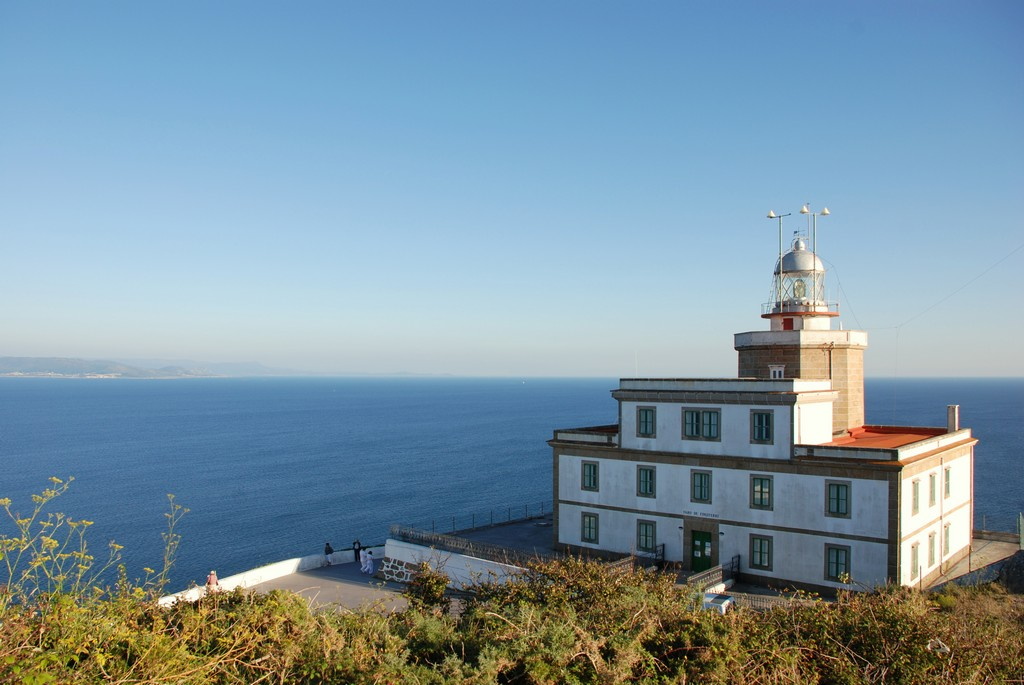
Cape Finisterre Lighthouse, end of the eighth stage

The eighth and last stage starts on the beach at Nemiña, Muxía and ends at the Cape Finisterre Lighthouse after traveling 26.9 kilometres (16.7 mi). This stage takes place in the municipalities of Muxía, Cee and Fisterra.

Cape Finisterre is also the final destination for many pilgrims on the Way of St. James, the pilgrimage to the shrine of the apostle Saint James the Great in the Cathedral of Santiago de Compostela. Cape Finisterre is about 90 kilometres (56 mi) from Santiago de Compostela.

== See also ==
- Category:Way of the Lighthouses

== Bibliography ==
- Brochure (2023). Asociación O Camiño dos Faros. caminodosfaros.com.
