= HMS Finisterre =

Battle-class destroyer

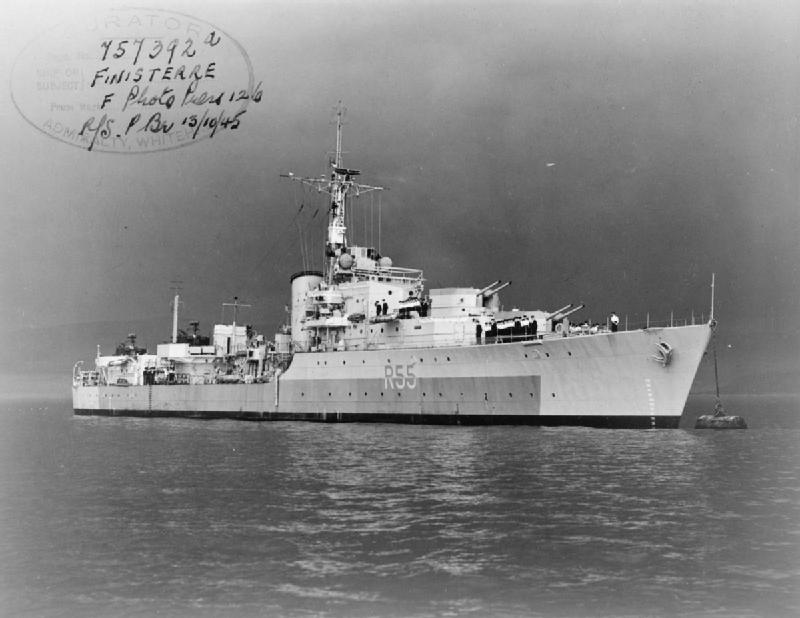

History

United Kingdom
- Name: HMS Finisterre
- Builder: Fairfield Shipbuilding and Engineering Company
- Laid down: 8 December 1942
- Launched: 22 June 1944
- Completed: 11 September 1945
- Decommissioned: 1965
- Identification: Pennant number D55
- Fate: Broken up 1967

General characteristics
- Class & type: Battle-class destroyer
- Displacement: 2,325 tons standard; 3,430 tons full load
- Length: 379 ft (116 m)
- Beam: 40 ft (12 m)
- Draught: 15.3 ft (4.7 m)
- Propulsion: 2 steam turbines, 2 shafts, 2 boilers, 50,000 shp (37 MW)
- Speed: 35.75 knots (66.21 km/h)
- Range: 4,400 nautical miles (8,100 km) at 12 knots (22 km/h)
- Complement: 268
- Armament: 2 × dual 4.5-inch (114 mm) gun; 1 × single 4-inch (102 mm) gun; 14 × Bofors 40 mm gun; 10 × 21 inch (533 mm) torpedo tubes; 1 × Squid mortar

Service record
- Part of: 1st Destroyer Squadron

HMS Finisterre was a Battle-class destroyer of the Royal Navy (RN). She was named after one of the battles of Cape Finisterre. She was the first and thus far the only ship of the Royal Navy to bear this name.

Finisterre was built by Fairfields of Govan on the Clyde. She was laid down on 8 December 1942, launched on 22 June 1944 and completed on 11 September 1945.

== Operational service ==
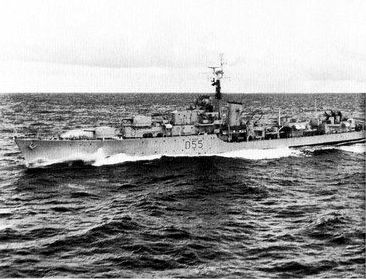
Finisterre in the North Atlantic, 1961.

Finisterre first joined the Home Fleet upon her commissioning. After being in the Far East for some time, in which she performed a variety of duties there, Finisterre returned to the UK via the Mediterranean. In January 1950, Finisterre took part in the rescue attempt of the submarine Truculent, which had sunk after colliding with the Swedish merchant ship Divina in the Thames Estuary. The collision had resulted in the loss of 64 of those on board. The following year Finisterre became the Gunnery Training Ship, based at Whale Island, Portsmouth as part of HMS Excellent.

In 1953, Finisterre took part in the 1953 Coronation Fleet Review to celebrate the Coronation of Queen Elizabeth II. Finisterre was positioned adjacent to her sister ship St. James.

The following year Finisterre was placed in Reserve. After her sister ship, Hogue, collided with an Indian cruiser in August 1959, Finisterre replaced her in the 1st Destroyer Squadron, based in the Far East. She took over duties of her sister ship, Hogue, to complete a tour of Australia over the Christmas period of 1959. Finisterre, as part of that squadron, subsequently saw service with the Home and Mediterranean Fleets. She was one of a number of Royal Navy ships stationed off Kuwait to keep the peace as the country gained its independence in 1961.

== Decommissioning and disposal ==
She arrived for scrapping at the yard of W.H.Arnott Young Co. Ltd, Dalmuir on 12 June 1967.

== Publications ==
- Colledge, J. J.; Warlow, Ben (2006) [1969]. Ships of the Royal Navy: The Complete Record of All Fighting Ships of the Royal Navy from the 15th Century to the Present (3rd Rev ed.). London: Chatham Publishing. ISBN 978-1-86176-281-8. OCLC 67375475.
- Hodges, Peter (1971). Battle Class Destroyers. London: Almark Publishing. ISBN 0-85524-012-1.
- Marriott, Leo (1989). Royal Navy Destroyers since 1945. Shepperton: Ian Allan. ISBN 0711018170.
