= Cape Finisterre =

Peninsula on the west coast of Galicia, Spain

Cape Finisterre: Cabo Fisterra (Galician); Cabo Finisterre (Spanish)
- Cape
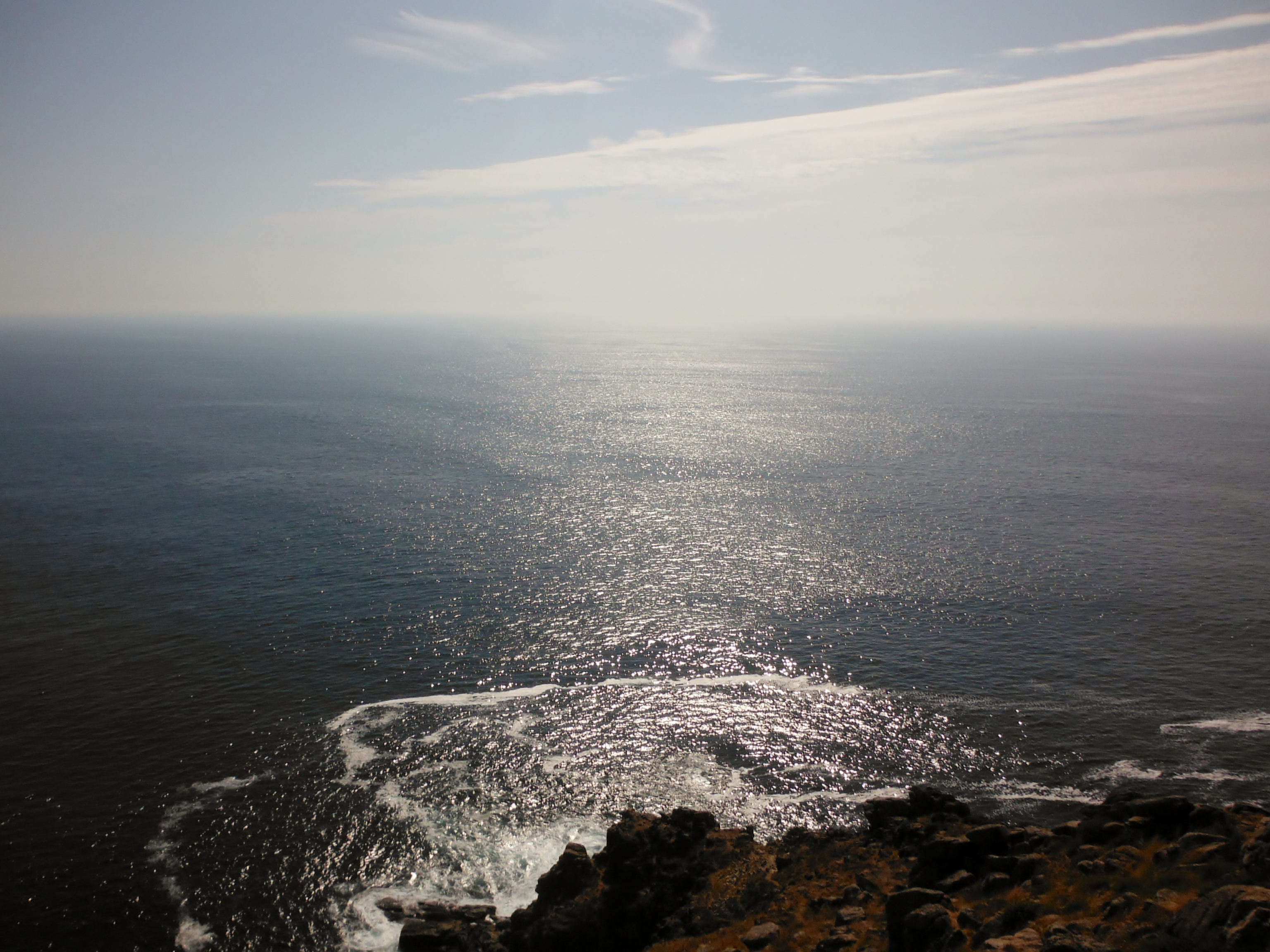
- Finisterre on the Atlantic coast of Galicia

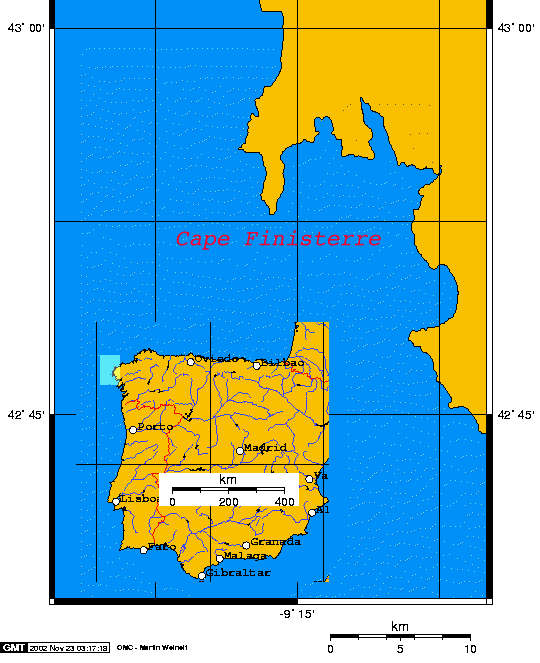

- Location within Spain
- Coordinates: 42°52′57″N 9°16′20″W
- Location: Galicia, Spain
- Water bodies: Atlantic Ocean

Cape Finisterre (/ˌfɪnɪˈstɛər/, also US: /-tɛri/; Galician: Cabo Fisterra [fisˈtɛrɐ]; Spanish: Cabo Finisterre [finisˈtere]) is a rock-bound peninsula on the west coast of Galicia, Spain.

In Roman times it was believed to be an end of the known world. The name Finisterre derives from the Latin finis terrae, meaning "end of the earth". It is sometimes said to be the westernmost point of the Iberian Peninsula. However, Cabo da Roca in Portugal is about 16.5 kilometres (10.3 mi) farther west and thus the westernmost point of continental Europe. Even in Spain Cabo Touriñán is 124 metres (135 yards) farther west.

Monte Facho is the name of the mountain on Cape Finisterre, which has a peak that is 238 metres (781 ft) above sea level. A prominent lighthouse is at the top of Monte Facho. The seaside town of Fisterra is nearby.

The Artabri were an ancient Gallaecian Celtic tribe that once inhabited the area.

== Geography ==
Cape Finisterre has several beaches, including O Rostro, Arnela, Mar de Fora, Langosteira, Riveira, and Corbeiro. Many of the beaches are framed by steep cliffs leading down to the Mare Tenebrosum (or dark sea, the name of the Atlantic in the Middle Ages). The peninsula contains the port and municipality of Fisterra.

There are several rocks in this area associated with religious legends, such as the "holy stones", the "stained wine stones", the "stone chair", and the tomb of the Celtic crone-goddess Orcabella.

== Pilgrimage ==
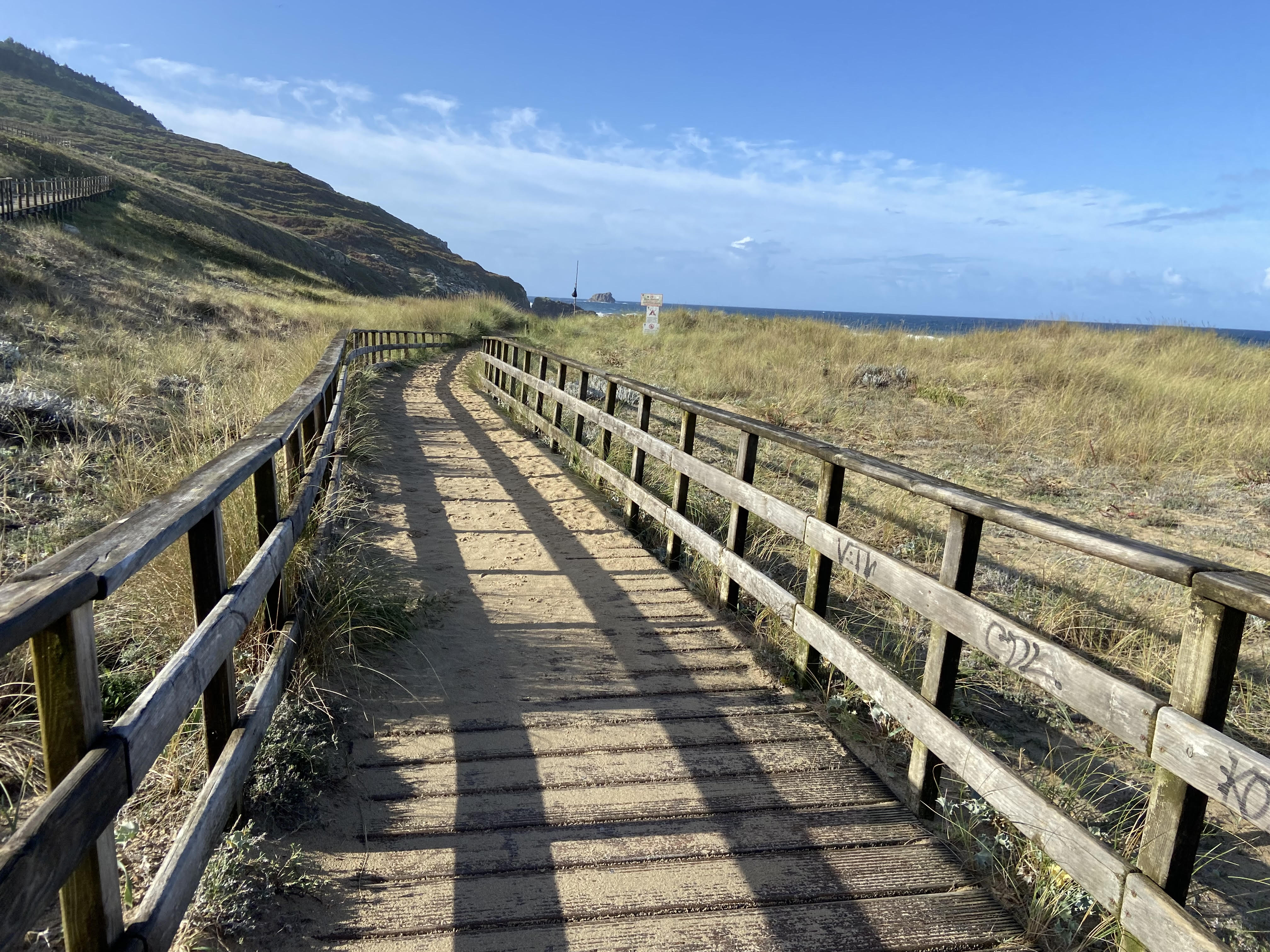
The Camino Way, Cape Finisterre

Cape Finisterre is the final destination for many pilgrims on the Way of St. James, the pilgrimage to the shrine of the apostle Saint James the Great in the Cathedral of Santiago de Compostela. Cape Finisterre is about 90 km (50 miles) from Santiago de Compostela. The name of this route is Camino Finisterre.

The origin of the pilgrimage to Finisterre is not certain. However, it is believed to date from pre-Christian times and was possibly associated with Finisterre's status as the "edge of the world" and a place to see the last sun of the day. The tradition continued in medieval times, when "hospitals" were established to cater to pilgrims along the route from Santiago de Compostela to Finisterre.

Some pilgrims continue on to Muxía, which is a day's walk away.

== Gallery ==
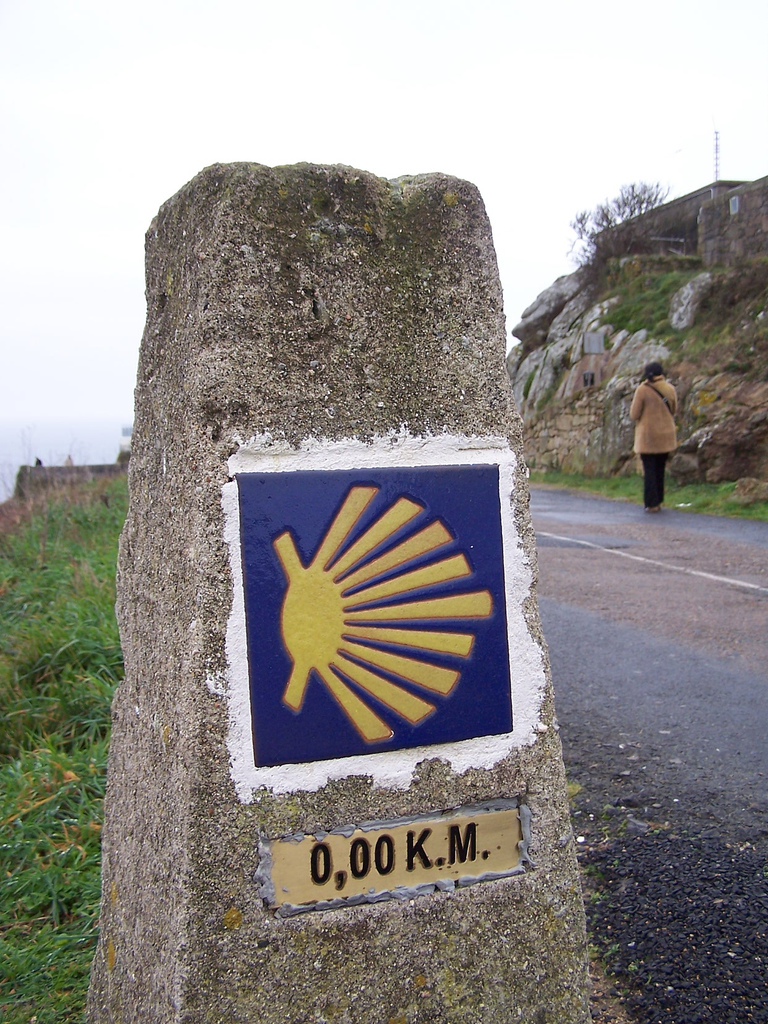
Trail marker at Cape Finisterre indicating the end of the Camino de Santiago.

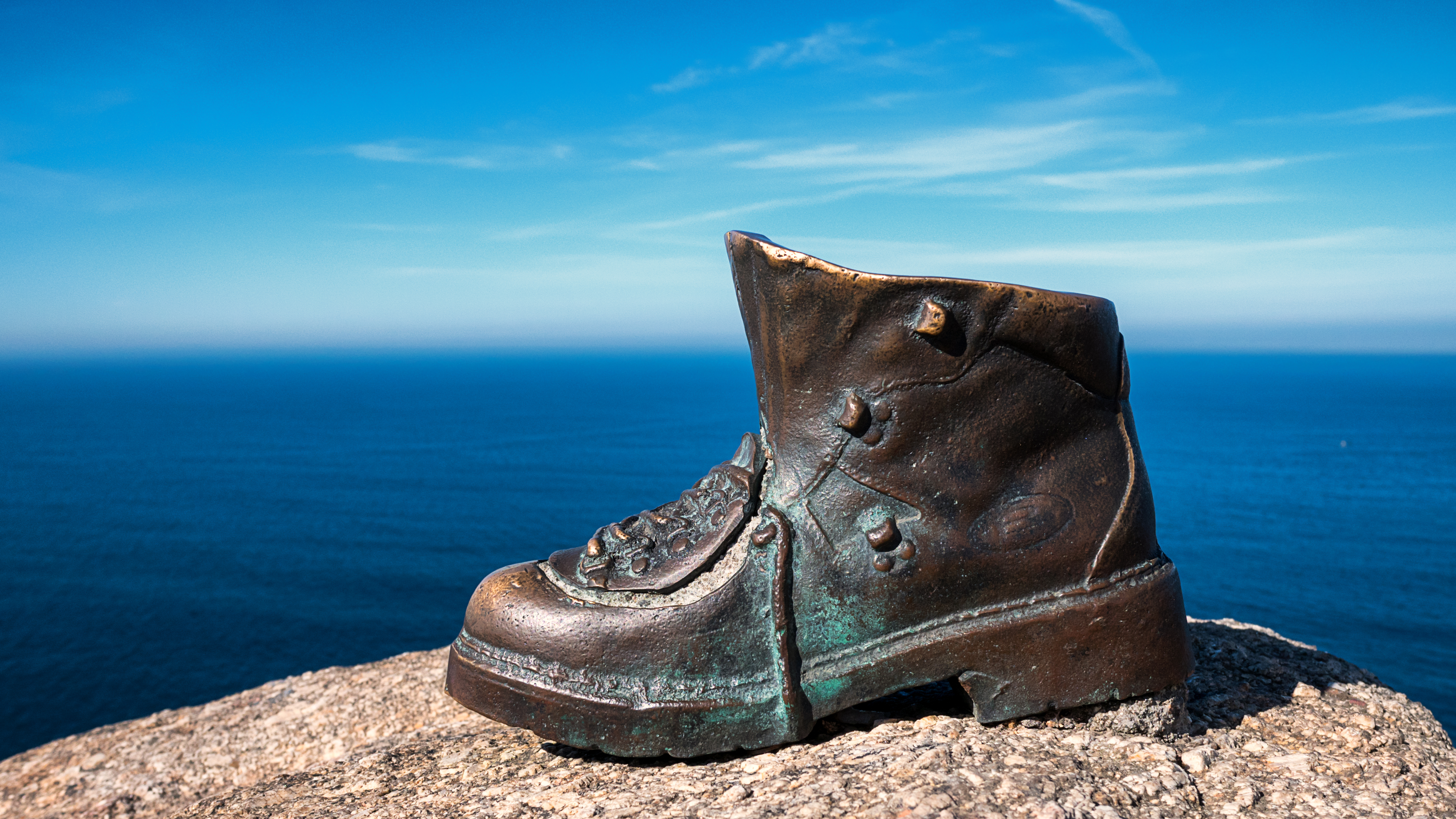
Bronze sculpture of a pilgrim's boot at Cape Finisterre.

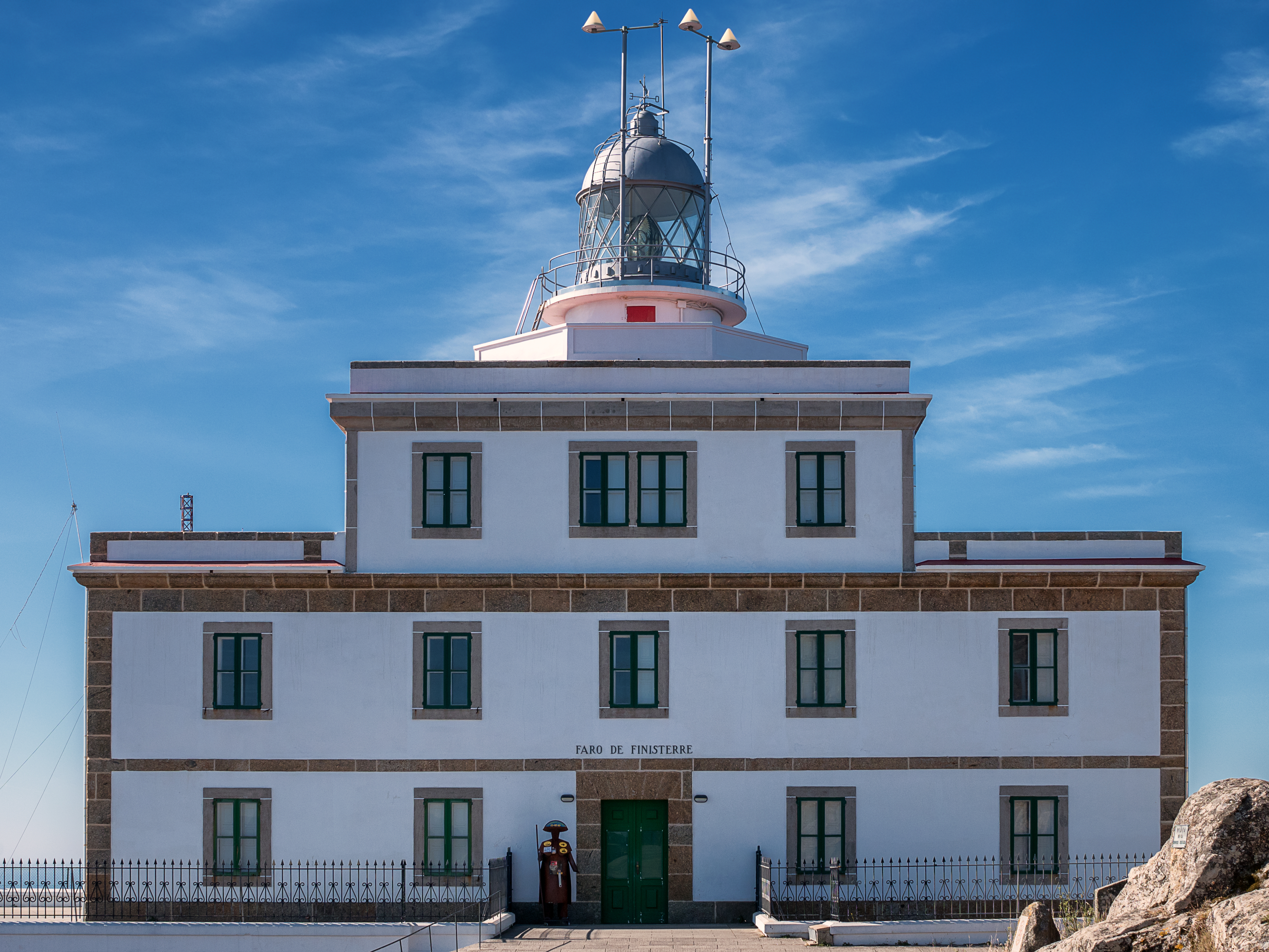
Cape Finisterre Lighthouse.

== Pre-Christian beliefs ==
There are many pre-Christian sacred locations in the area; they are connected to a variety of myths. There was an "Altar Soli" on Cape Finisterre, where the Celts engaged in sun worship and assorted rituals.

Greco-Roman historians called the local residents of Cape Finisterre the "Nerios". Monte Facho was the place where the Celtic Nerios from Duio carried out their offerings and rites in honor of the sun. Monte Facho is the site of current archaeological investigations and there is evidence of habitation on Monte Facho circa 1000 BCE. There is a Roman Road to the top of Monte Facho and the remnants of ancient structures on the mountain.

San Guillerme, also known as St. William of Penacorada, lived in a house located on Monte Facho. Near San Guillerme's house is a stone now known as "St William's Stone" (Pedra de San Guillerme). Sterile couples used to copulate on St. William's Stone to try to conceive, following a Celtic rite of fertility.

== Maritime history ==
The Phoenicians sailed from this cape to trade with Bronze Age Britain, with a possible point of landing for the Phoenician traders being Mount Batten.

As it is a prominent landfall on the route from northern Europe to the Mediterranean, several naval battles took place near the Cape. Notable battles include the First Battle of Cape Finisterre in 1747 during the War of the Austrian Succession and the Battle of Cape Finisterre in 1805 during the Napoleonic Wars. Both these battles were between the British Royal Navy and the French Navy, who were constantly battling for control of seas during the 18th century. The coast, known locally as the Costa da Morte (Death Coast), has been the site of numerous shipwrecks and founderings, including that of the British ironclad HMS Captain, leading to the loss of nearly 500 lives, in 1870.

Additionally, laws governing the colonies of the British Empire (including the 1766 amendment to the Sugar Act 1764) used the latitude of Cape Finisterre as the latitude past which certain goods could not be shipped north directly between British colonies. For instance, it was forbidden to ship sugar cane directly from Jamaica to Nova Scotia, as such a transaction crossed through this latitude. Instead, the laws required that the sugar cane be shipped first from Jamaica to Britain, where it would be re-exported to Nova Scotia.

Likewise, the latitude of Cape Finisterre was used to signal that a change of flags flown by Norwegian and Swedish merchant ships was required. Following independence and the subsequent union with Sweden in 1814, Norwegian merchant ships were required to fly the Swedish flag (until 1818) and the Swedish flag with the Norwegian (the Dannebrog with the Norwegian lion) flag in the canton. From 1818 to 1821, Swedish merchant ships also flew this flag in place of the Swedish flag (until 1844) when sailing south of Cape Finisterre.

Finisterre was the former name of the current FitzRoy sea area used in the UK Shipping Forecast. It was renamed FitzRoy in 2002 (in honour of the founder of the Met Office) to avoid confusion with the smaller sea area of the same name featuring in the marine forecasts produced by the French and Spanish meteorological offices.

In the 2010s and 2020s, the waters of Cape Finisterrre have been the venue for several orca attacks against sailboats at Atlantic Ocean.

== See also ==
- Way of the Lighthouses
- Land's End
- Finistère
