= A Ferida =

Sculpture in the municipality of Muxía, A Coruña, Spain

- The Wound
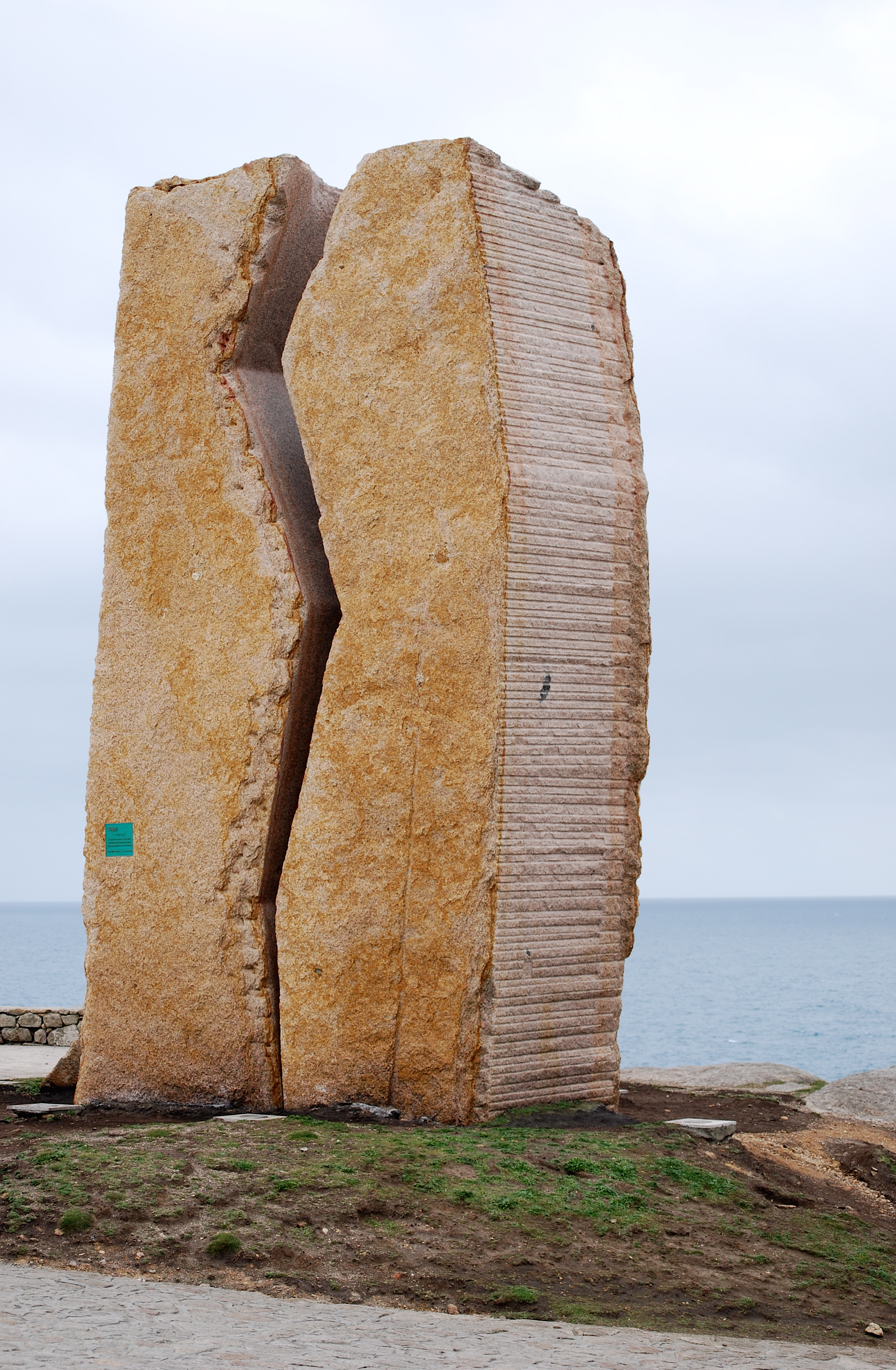
- The sculpture in 2009
- Artist: Alberto Bañuelos Fournier
- Year: 2003
- Medium: Granite
- Dimensions: 11 m (430 in)
- Weight: 400 tonnes
- Location: Muxia, Spain; 43.111166°N 9.221645°W
- Owner: Galicia

A Ferida (English: The Wound) is a sculpture located in the municipality of Muxía, A Coruña, Spain. Made by sculptor, Alberto Bañuelos Fournier, it faces the Atlantic Ocean, outside the entrance of the Virxe da Barca sanctuary.

The granite sculpture stands more than 11 metres (36 ft) in height and weighs 400 tons. The granite came from O Porriño, and it is the largest sculpture in Galicia and Spain.

== Background ==
The work was donated by Seguros Aegon to the Muxián council as a tribute to the volunteers who came to help the Galician people when the Prestige oil spill occurred on November 13, 2002. It was inaugurated on September 12, 2003.

== Gallery ==
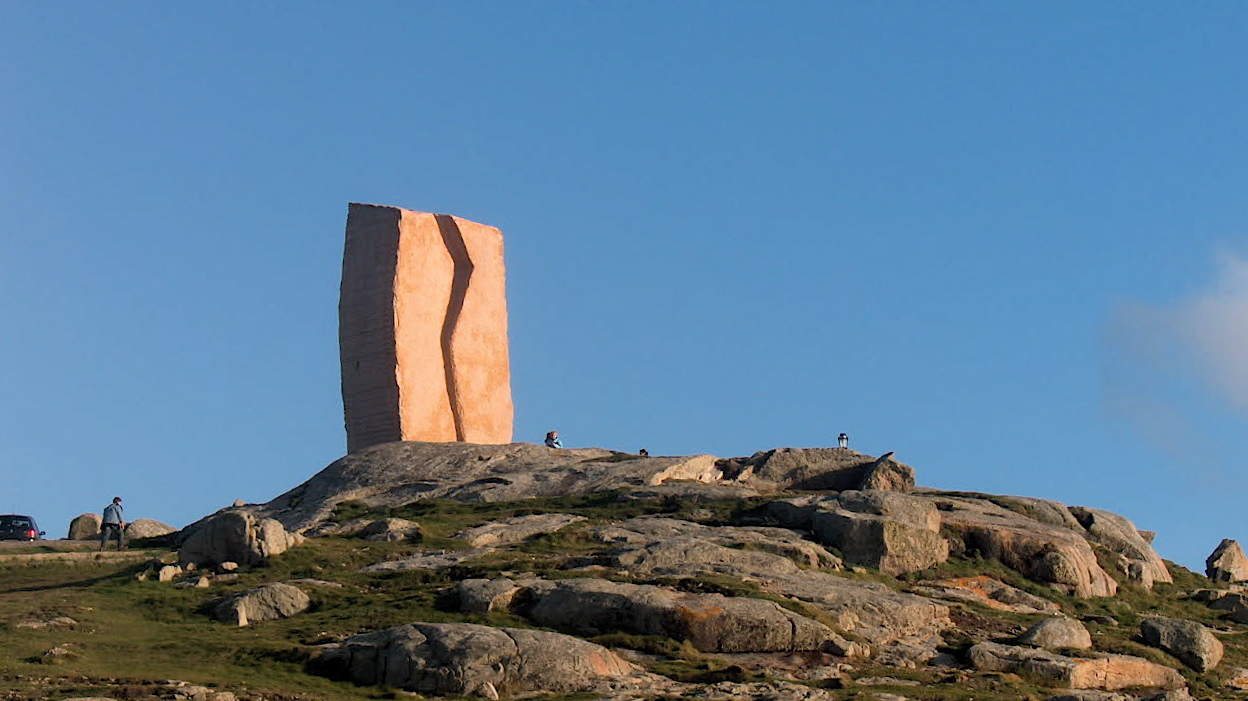
A Ferida

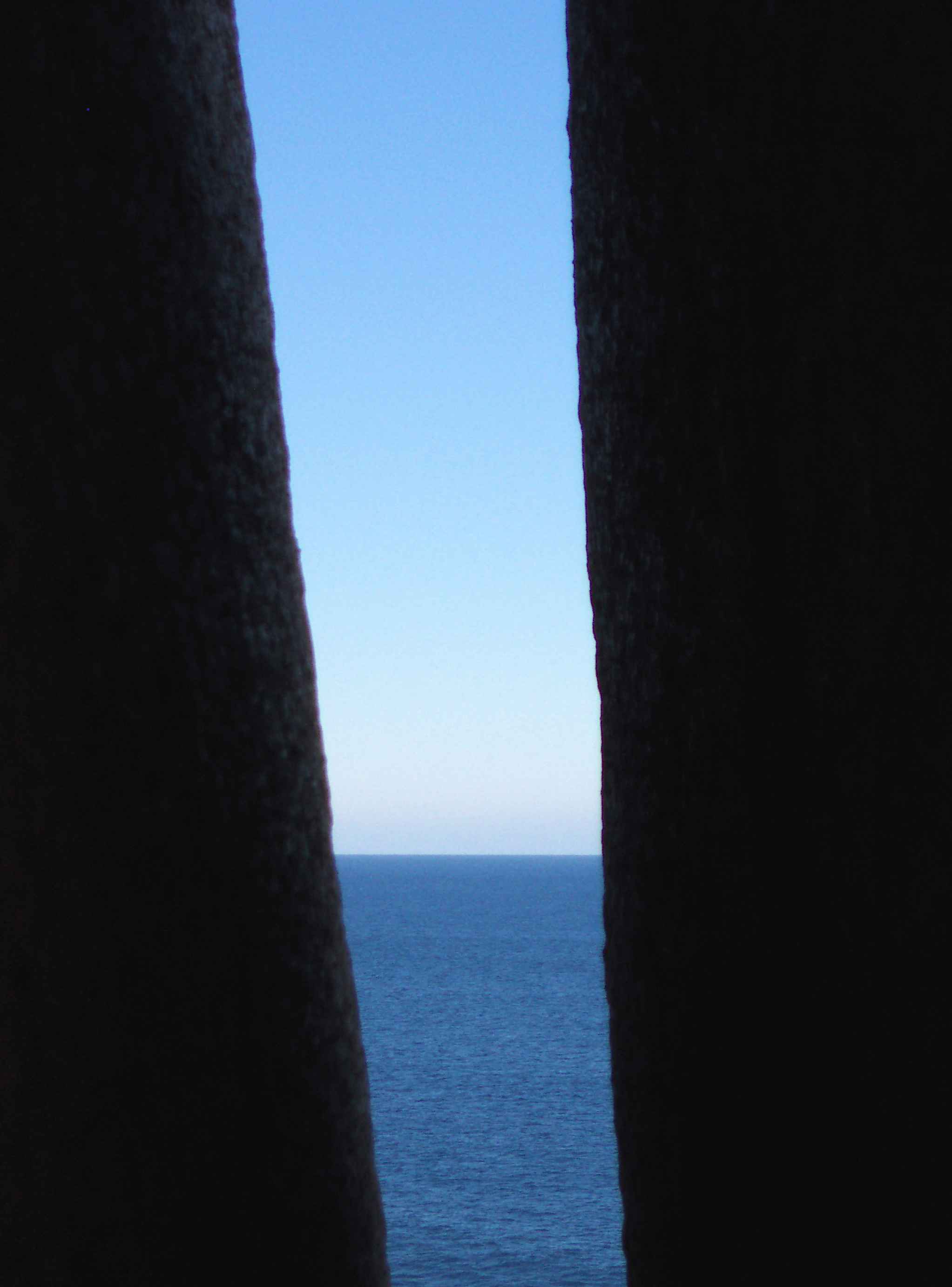
A Ferida

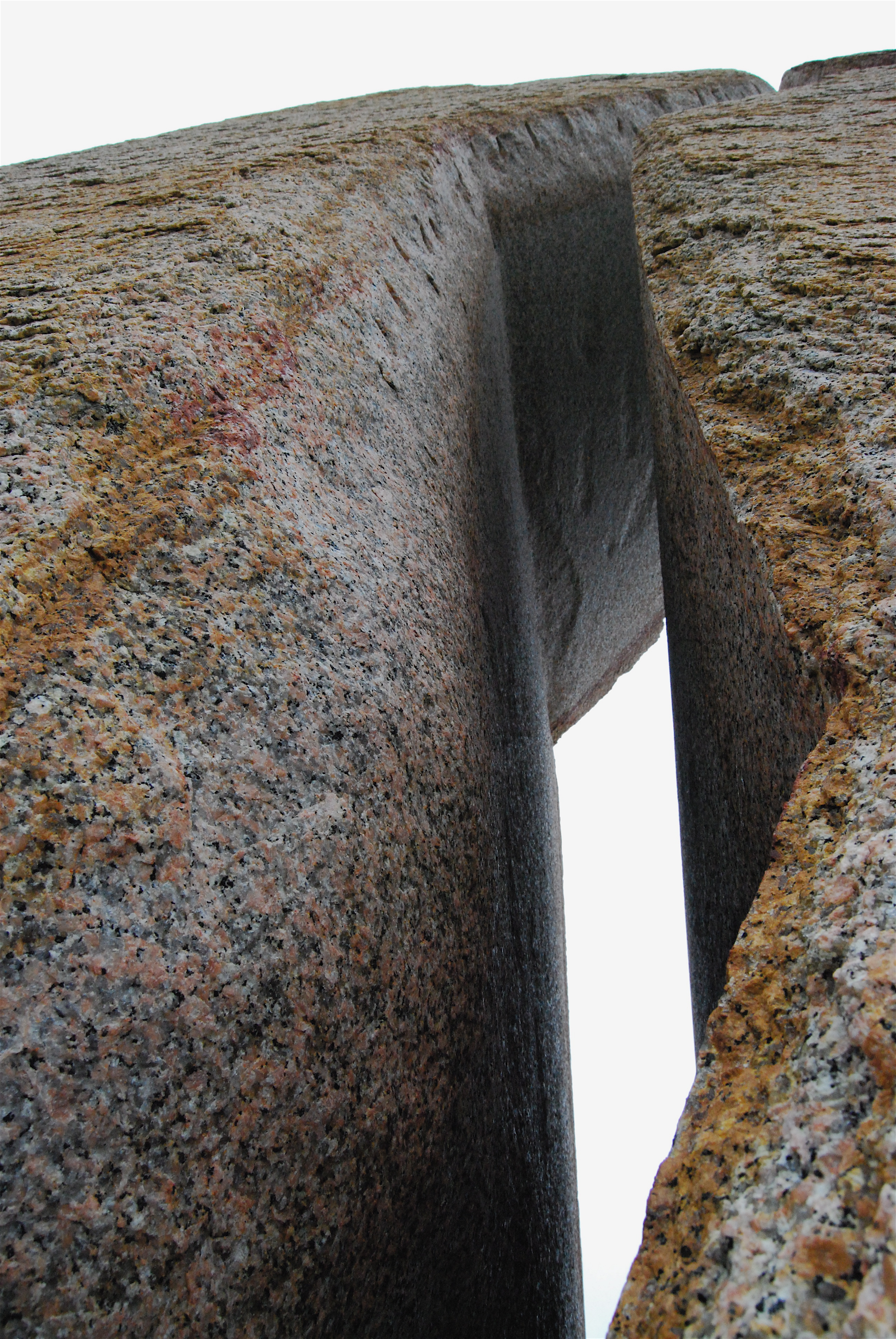
A Ferida

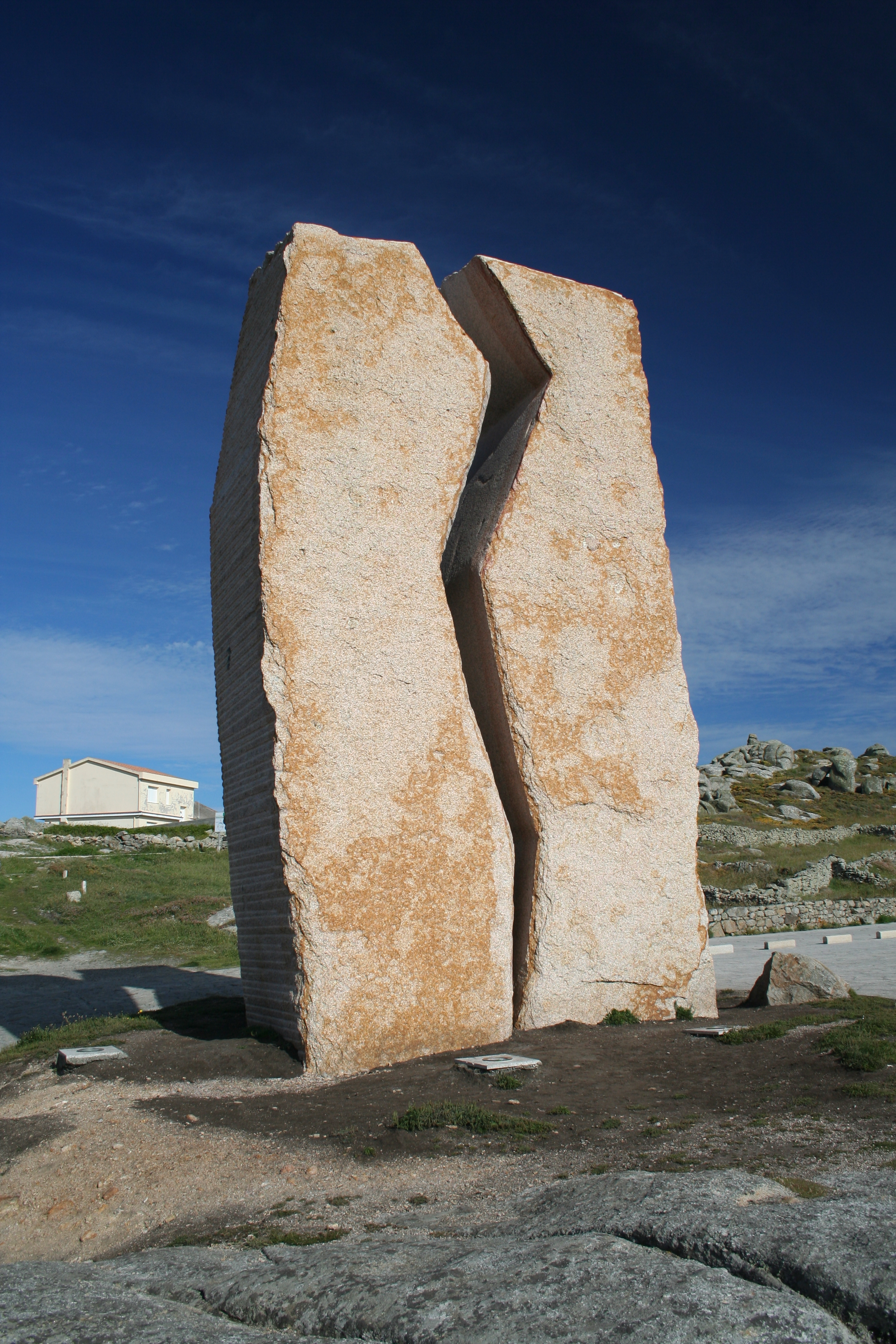
A Ferida

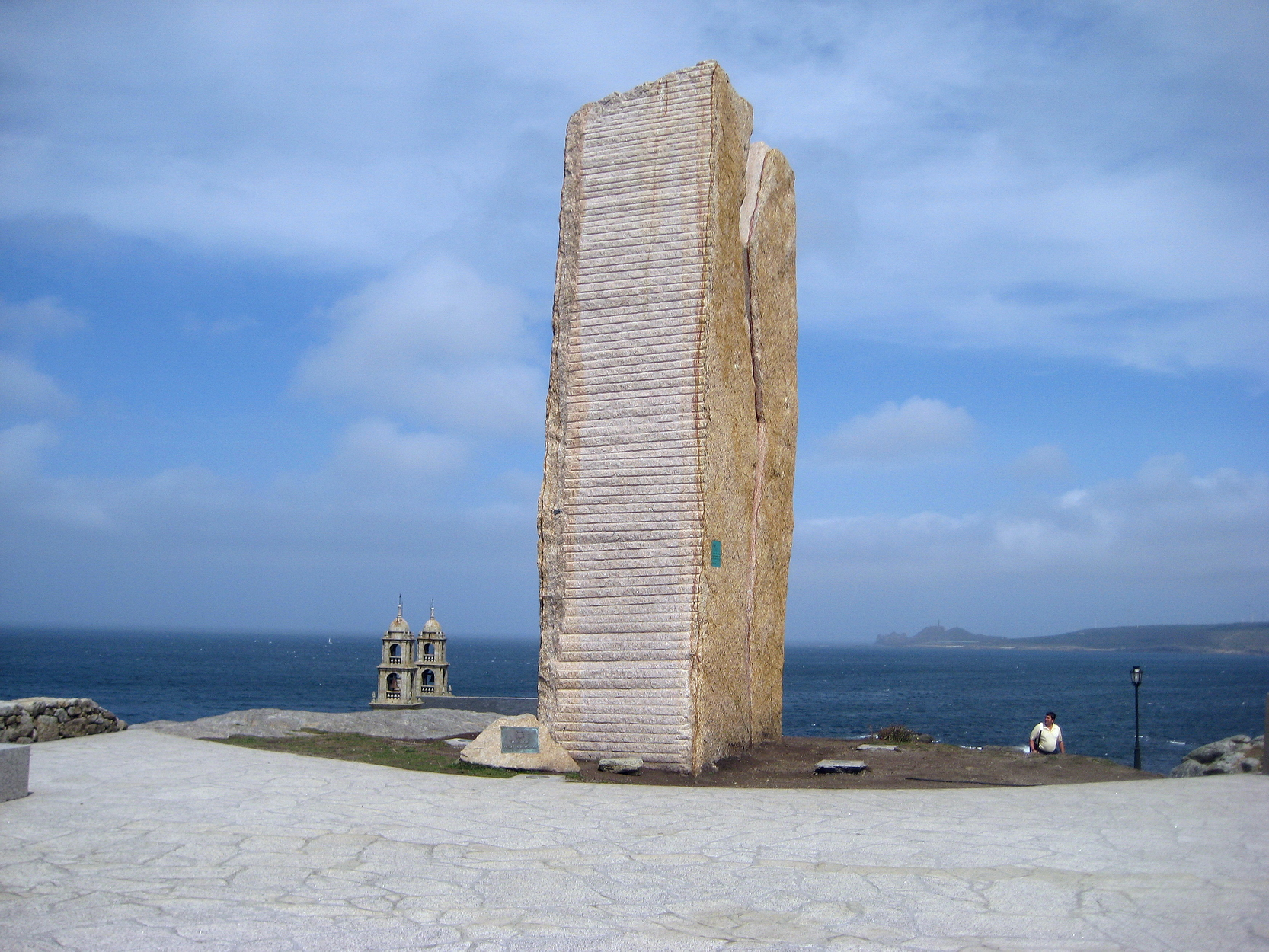
A Ferida

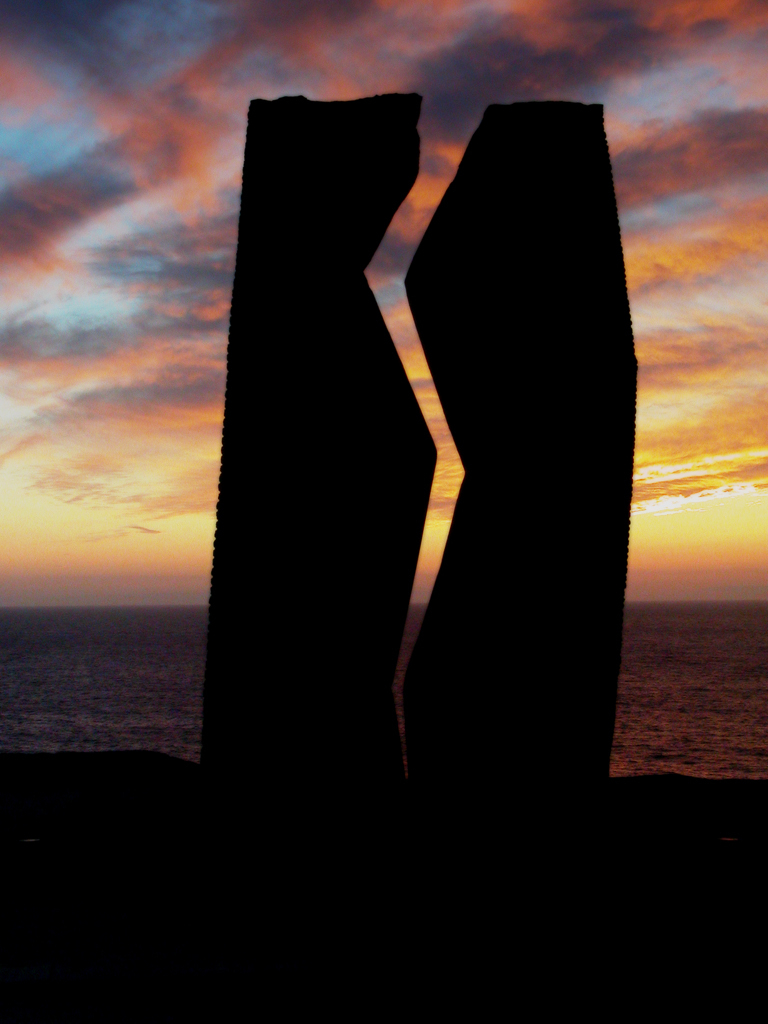
A Ferida

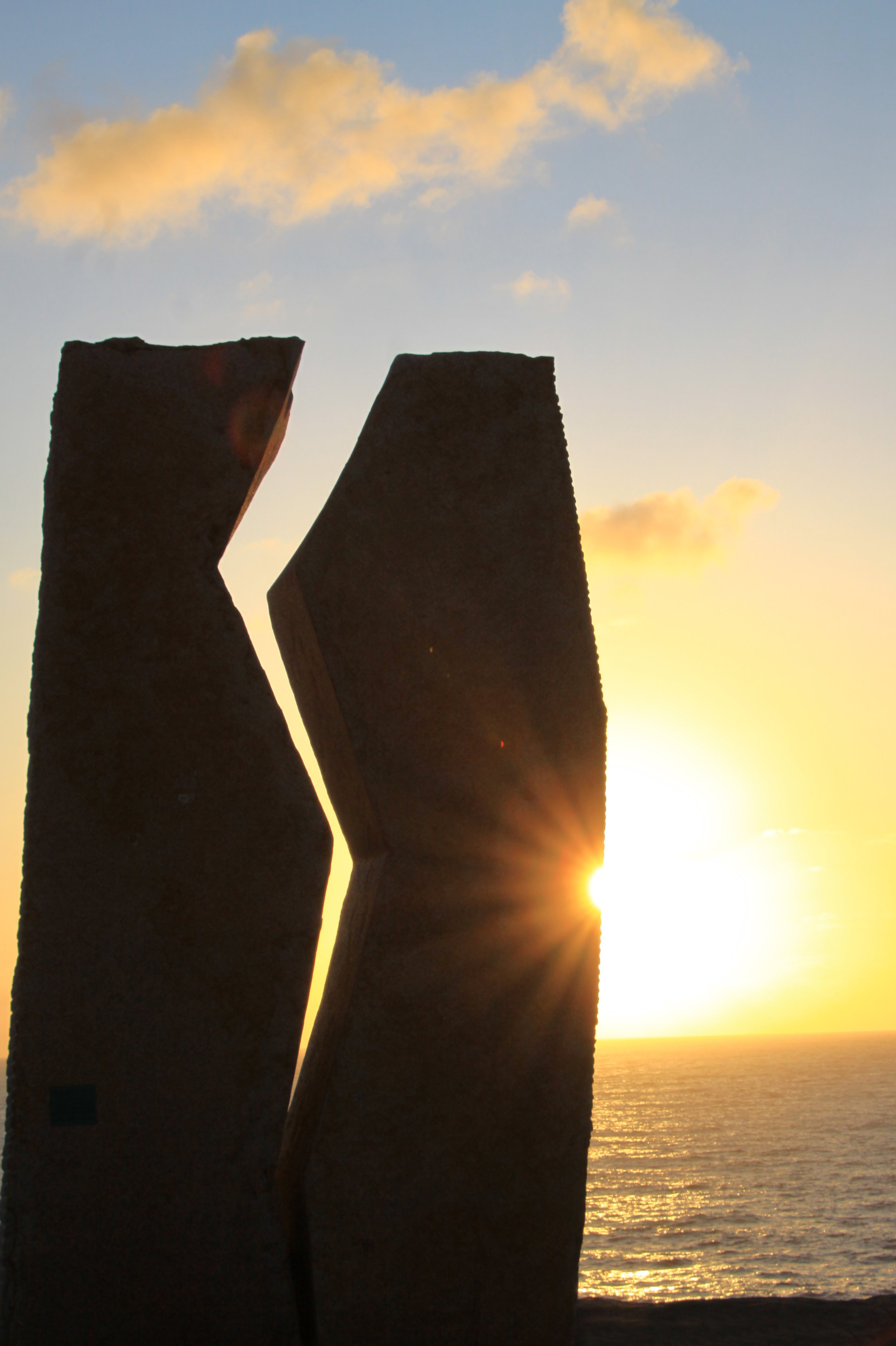
A Ferida

== See also ==
- Camiño dos Faros
