= Church of San Xulián de Moraime =

Church in Galicia, Spain

Coordinates: 43°05′05″N 9°11′59″W

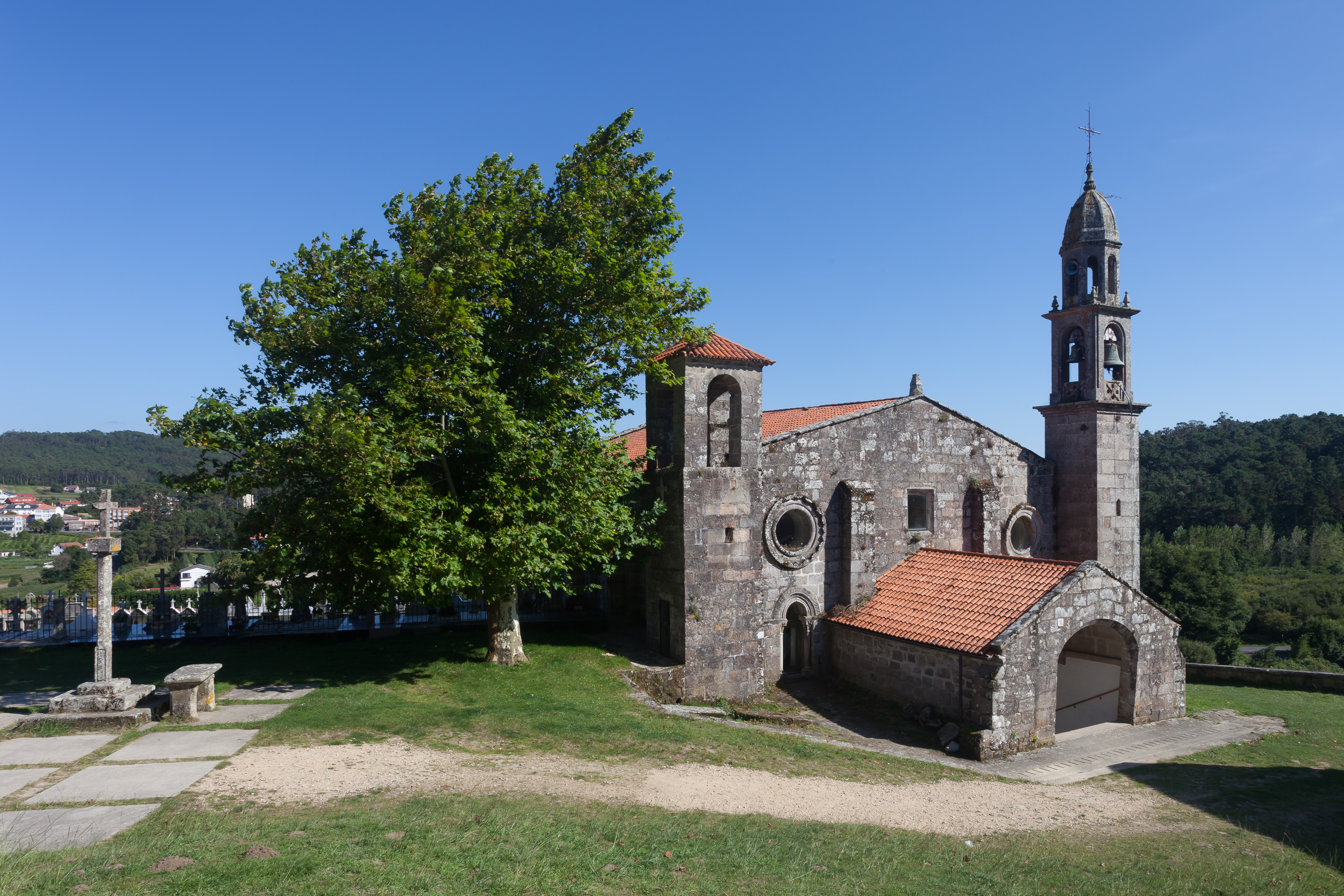
Church of San Julian de Moraime

The Church of San Julián de Moraime is a church in the Moraime area of Muxia, a town in Galicia, Spain. It was a Benedictine monastery, established in the 12th century originally.

The monastery near Muxia was named "Mosteiro de Moraime" to honor the saint, San Xiao de Moraime, and was established in the early 12th century. Not long after, in 1105, it was attacked and destroyed by Norman pirates, and later by Saxons. Alfonso Raimúndez (King Afonso V of Galicia and the future King Alfonso VII of León and eventually of Castile, and emperor of Spain), had lived in the area when he was younger and was educated by Pedro Froilaz de Traba. Although he was only 14 at the time, Alfonso restored the monastery with a donation in 1119.
