= Cape Finisterre Lighthouse =

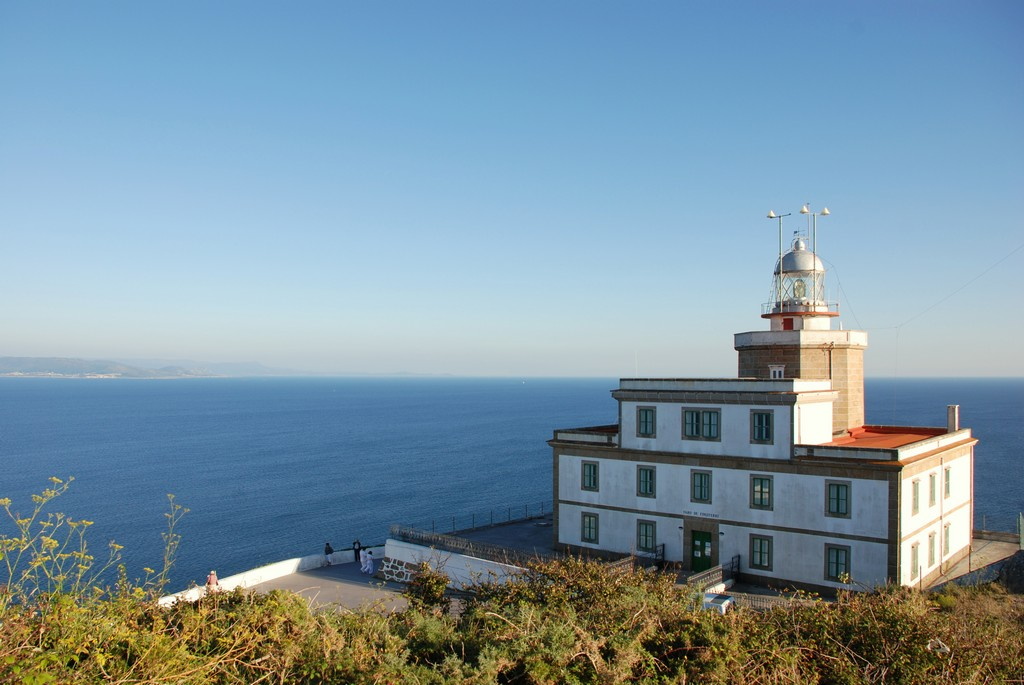
- General view of the lighthouse, overlooking the Atlantic Ocean
- Location: Cape Finisterre; Galicia; Spain
- Coordinates: 42.882362°N 9.271849°W

Tower
- Constructed: 1853
- Construction: granite tower
- Height: 17 metres (56 ft)
- Shape: octagonal tower with balcony and lantern attached to keeper's house
- Markings: unpainted tower, silver lantern
- Power source: mains electricity
- Operator: A Coruña Port Authority
- Racon: O

Light
- Focal height: 143 metres (469 ft)
- Range: 23 nautical miles (43 km; 26 mi)
- Characteristic: Fl W 5s.
- Spain no.: ES-03900

The Cape Finisterre Lighthouse (Galician: Faro de Fisterra, Spanish: Faro de Finisterre) is an active lighthouse on Cape Finisterre, on the northwestern coast of Galicia in Spain.

== History and characteristics ==
The construction of the lighthouse formed part of the 1847 General Plan for Maritime Lighting along the Spanish Coast, launched by the Government to establish an organised network of maritime signalling. Until then, the Tower of Hercules had been Galicia’s main lighthouse.

The project was entrusted to the engineer Félix Uhagón. The works were completed in 1853 and the lighthouse came into operation on 1 June of that year. It was originally lit by an olive oil lamp, which had a range of approximately 24 nautical miles (44 kilometres). The original complex is typical of 19th-century lighthouses, which combined technical facilities with residential accommodation for the workers responsible for their maintenance.

Between 1879 and 1883, a maritime signalling station was built at a higher elevation than the lighthouse. Its original purpose was to transmit information on maritime traffic and weather conditions using visual signals, including flags.

A foghorn, popularly known as the ‘Cow of Fisterra’, was put into operation in 1889. Its purpose was to warn of the proximity of the coast when weather conditions made it impossible to see the lighthouse’s light. It emitted acoustic signals audible over tens of kilometres.

The original oil lamp was replaced by other lighting systems that used fuels such as paraffin and petroleum. The lighthouse was electrified in 1931, enabling its beam of light to be seen from a maximum distance of 31 miles.

== See also ==
- List of lighthouses in Spain
- The Lighthouse Way
