= Castelo, Loureiro =

Place in Galicia, Spain

Coordinates: 42°42′47″N 7°22′59″W

Castelo de Lourido is a place in the parish of Loureiro in the local council of Sarria in the region of Sarria, Lugo, in the autonomous community of Galicia.

== See also ==
- The Lighthouse Way
