= Virxe da Barca sanctuary =

- El Santuario de la Virgen de la Barca; Santuario da Virxe da Barca
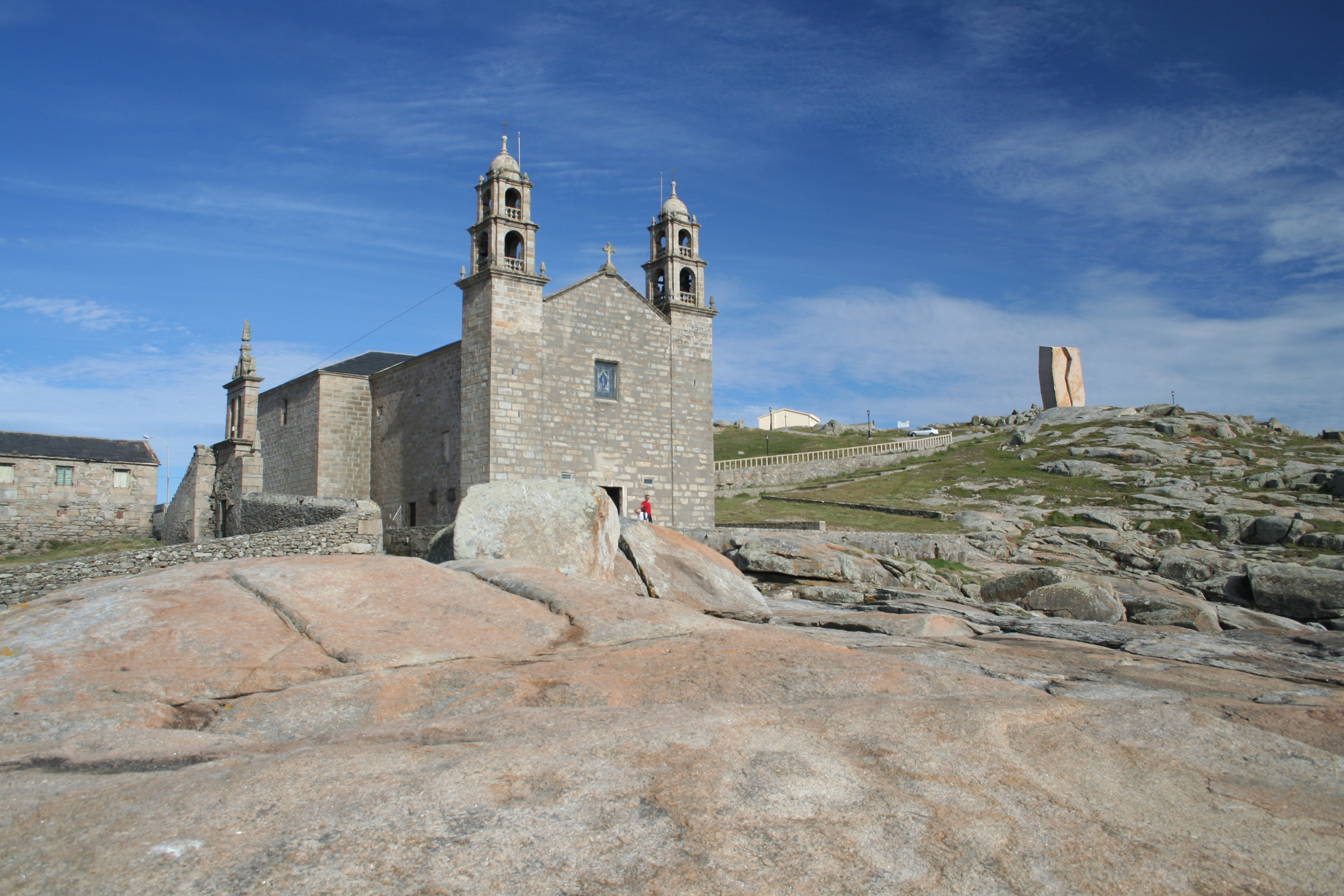
- Virxe da Barca sanctuary. In the background, A Ferida, a tribute sculpture to the volunteers who helped to clean the Prestige oil spill.
- Virxe da Barca sanctuary
- 43°06′43″N 09°13′10″W
- Location: Muxía
- Country: Spain
- Denomination: Roman Catholic
- Website: website

History
- Founded: 17th century

Architecture
- Functional status: Destroyed by lightning, 25 December 2013

The Virxe da Barca sanctuary is a church located in Muxía, Spain. It was destroyed by a fire that was started by lightning on 25 December 2013.

== History ==
The sanctuary was originally a pre-Christian Celtic shrine and sacred spot. This part of Spain was resistant to conversion to Christianity, and was only converted in the 12th century. The Christians built a hermitage on this location at first, and later the present church in the 17th century.

== Gallery ==
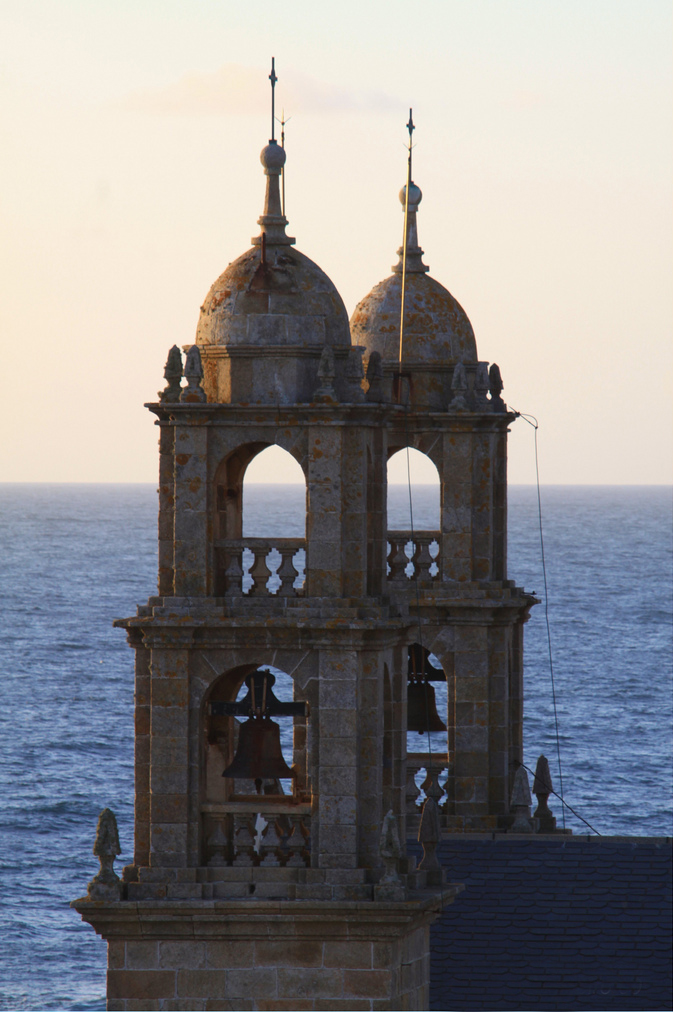
Towers

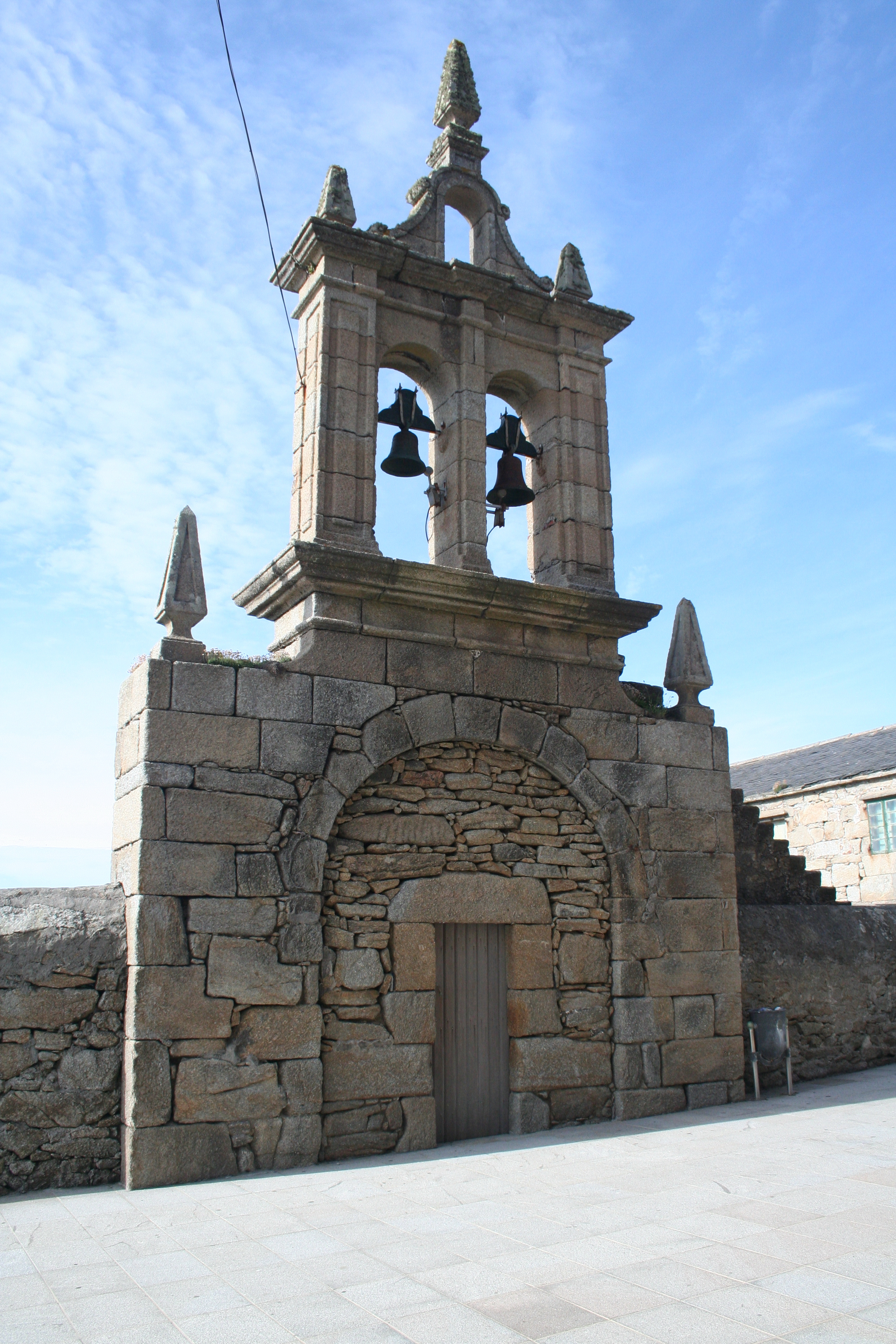
Gate

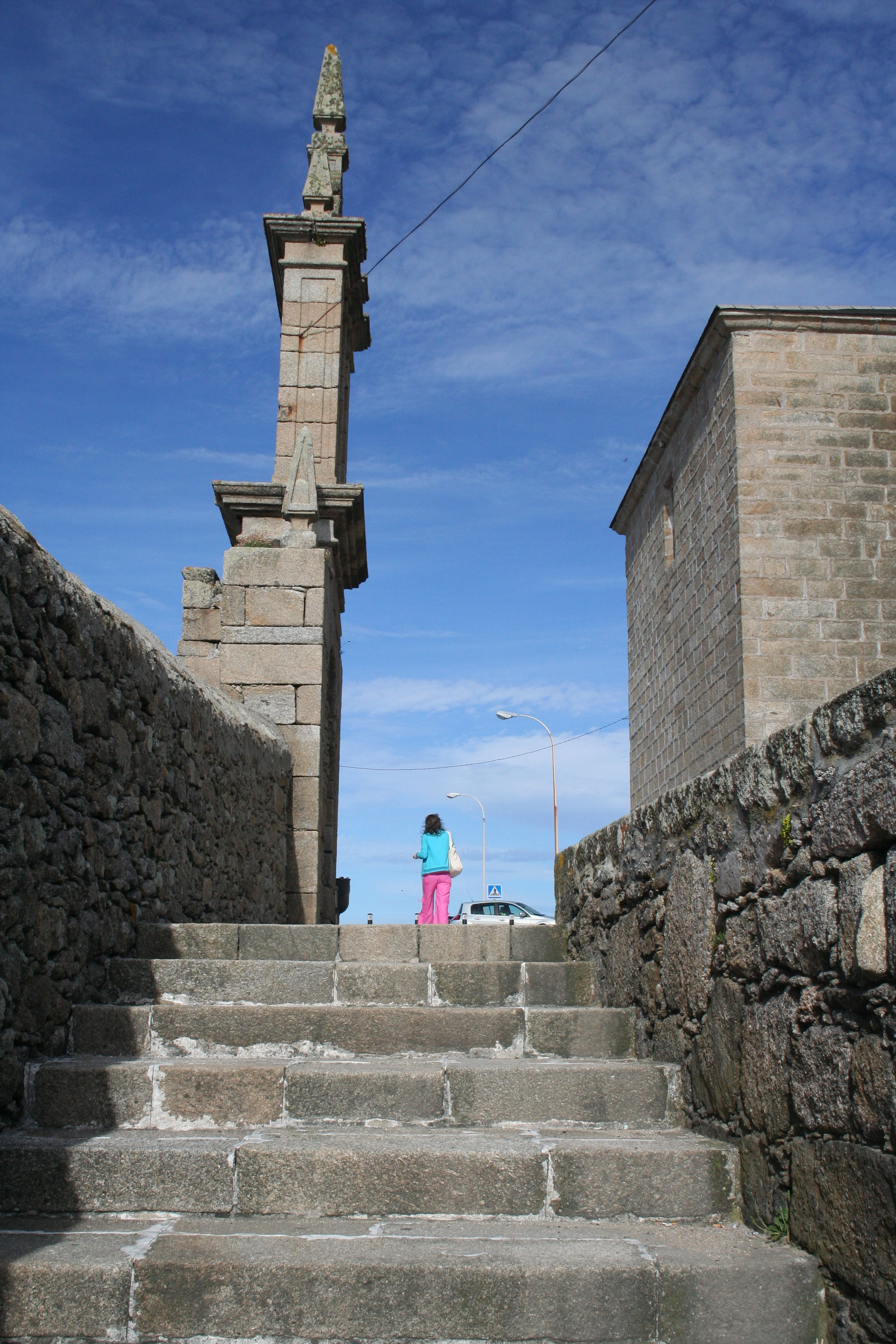
Stairwells

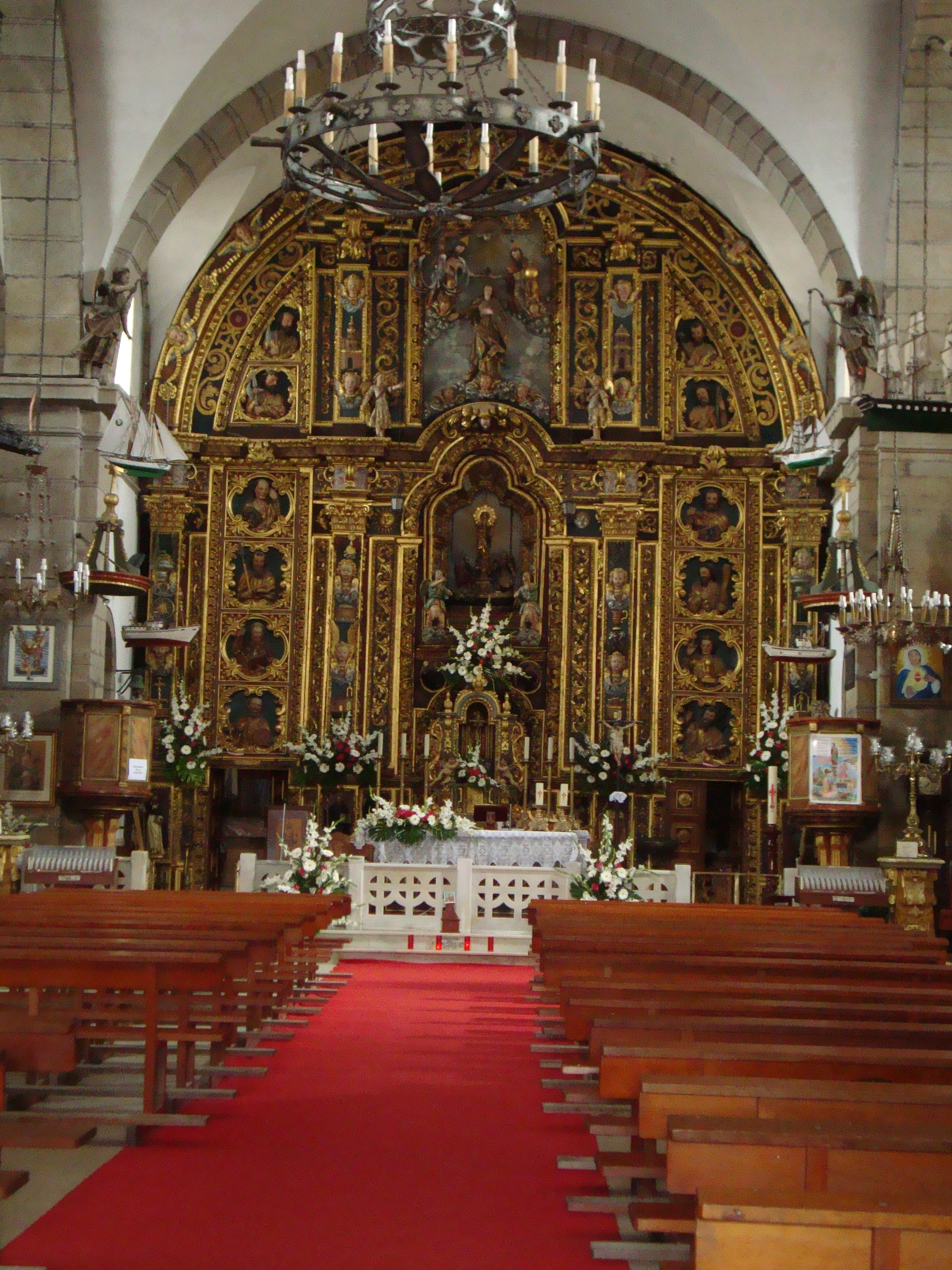
Interior, before fire

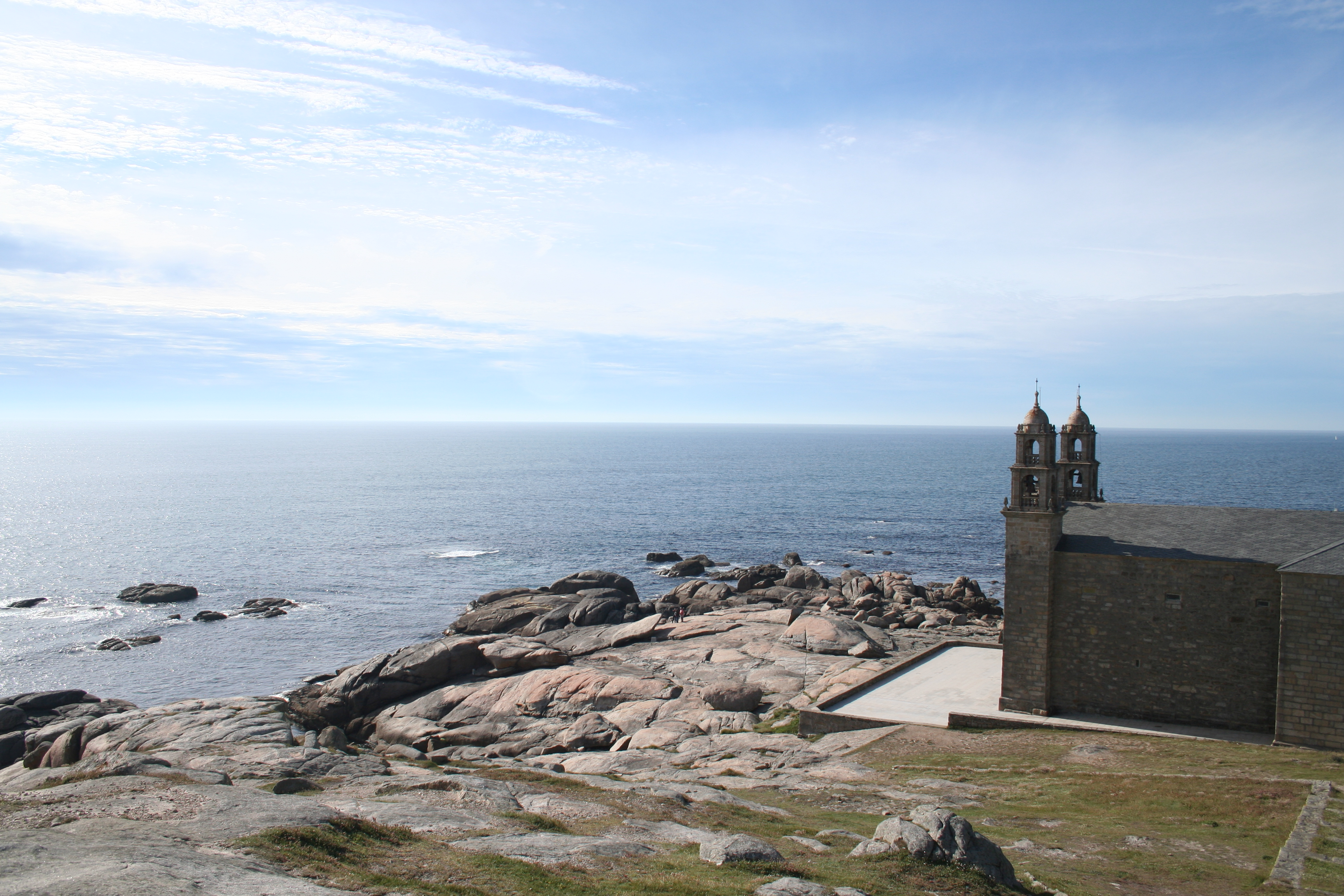
The sanctuary is near to the sea

== See also ==
- List of destroyed heritage
