= Battle of Cape Finisterre =

Four naval battles fought between Britain and France near Cape Finisterre in northwest Spain are known as the Battle of Cape Finisterre:

== War of Austrian Succession ==
- First Battle of Cape Finisterre (1747), 14 May 1747 victory for a British fleet over the French
- Second Battle of Cape Finisterre, 25 October 1747 victory for a British fleet over the French

== Other battles ==
- Battle of Cape Finisterre (1761), 13–14 August, victory for a British squadron over a French one during the Seven Years' War
- Battle of Cape Finisterre (1805), 22 July, an inconclusive encounter between a British fleet and a Franco-Spanish fleet during the War of the Third Coalition
