= Muxía =

Coordinates: 43°6′17″N 9°13′5″W

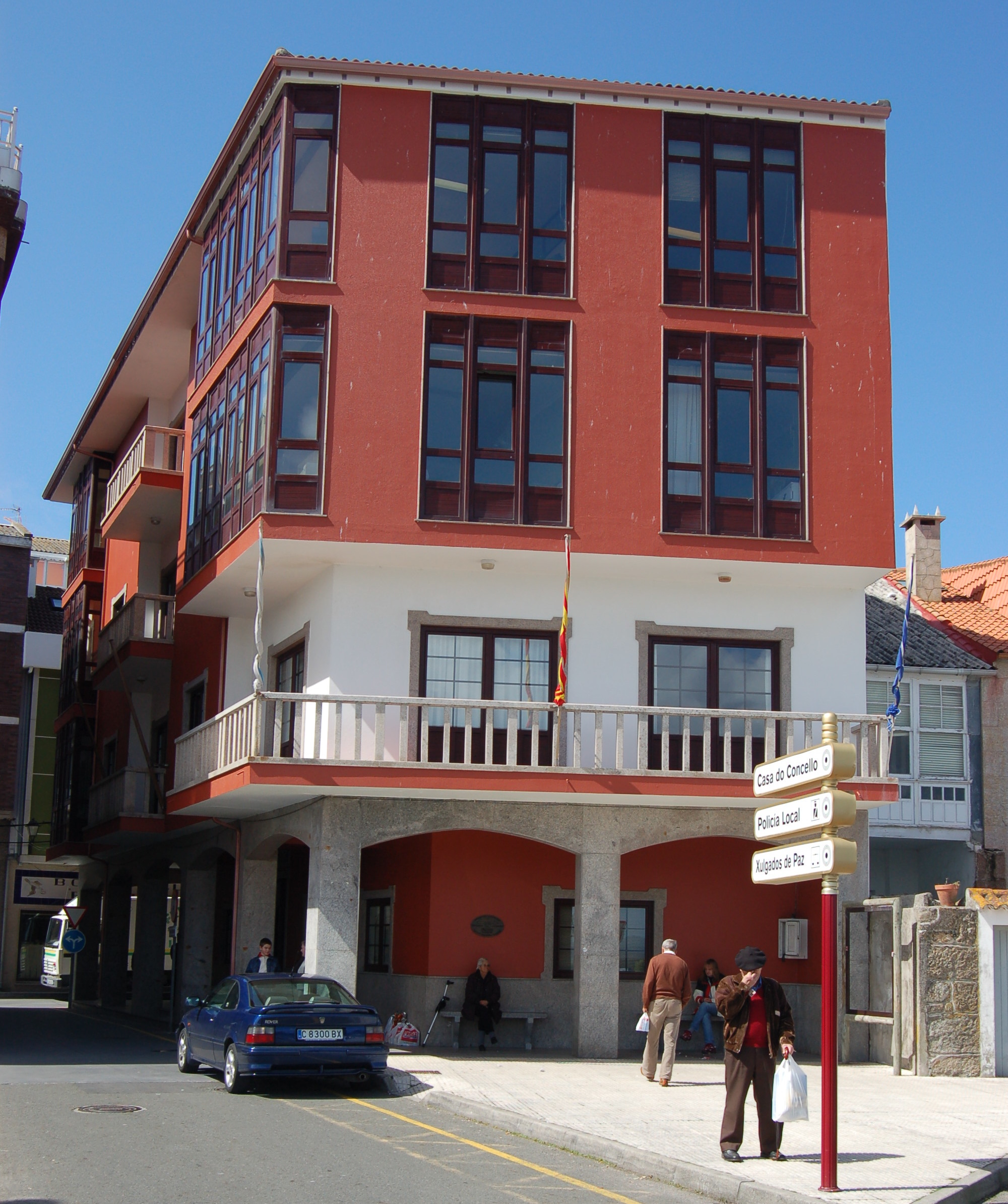
- Muxía town hall

- Coat of arms

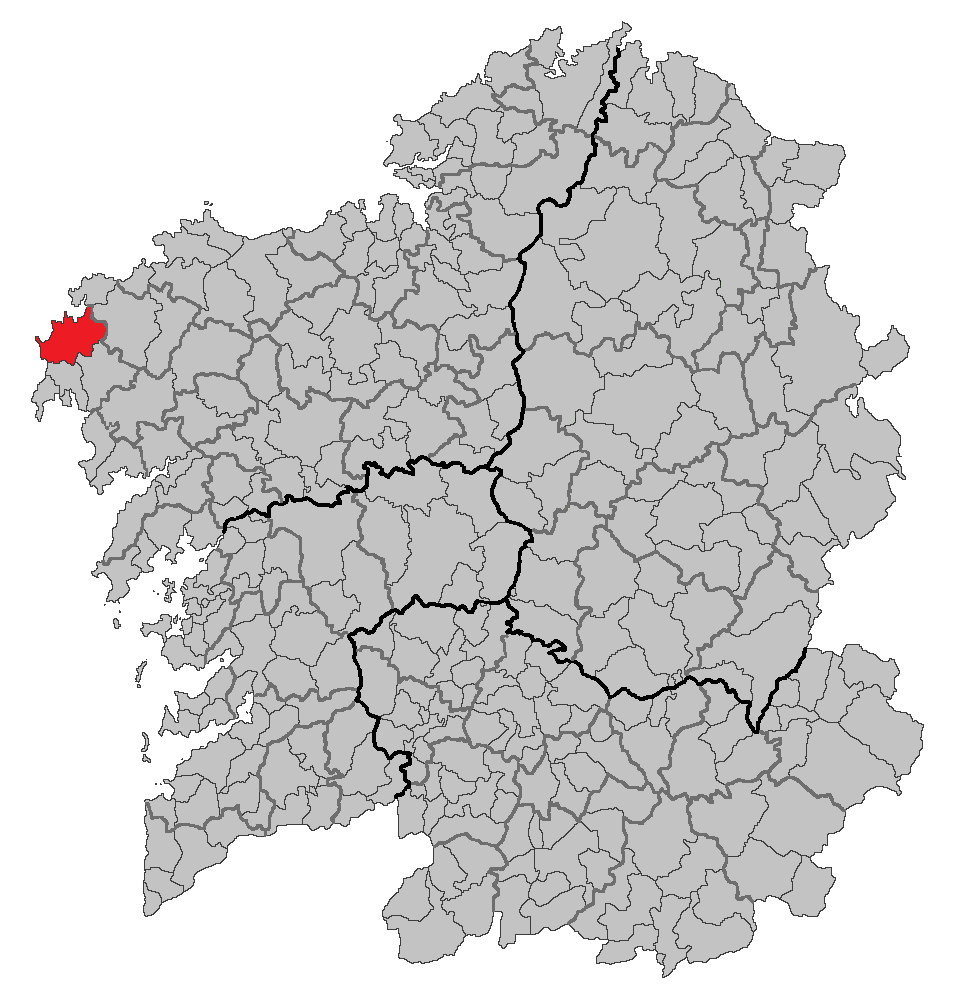
- Location of Muxía within Galicia

Population (2025-01-01)
  - Total: 4,326
- Time zone: UTC+1 (CET)
  - Summer (DST): UTC+2 (CEST)

Muxía (Galician pronunciation: [muˈʃi.ɐ]; Spanish: Mugía [muˈxi.a]) is a coastal town and municipality in the province of A Coruña in the autonomous community of Galicia in northwestern Spain. It belongs to the comarca of Fisterra.

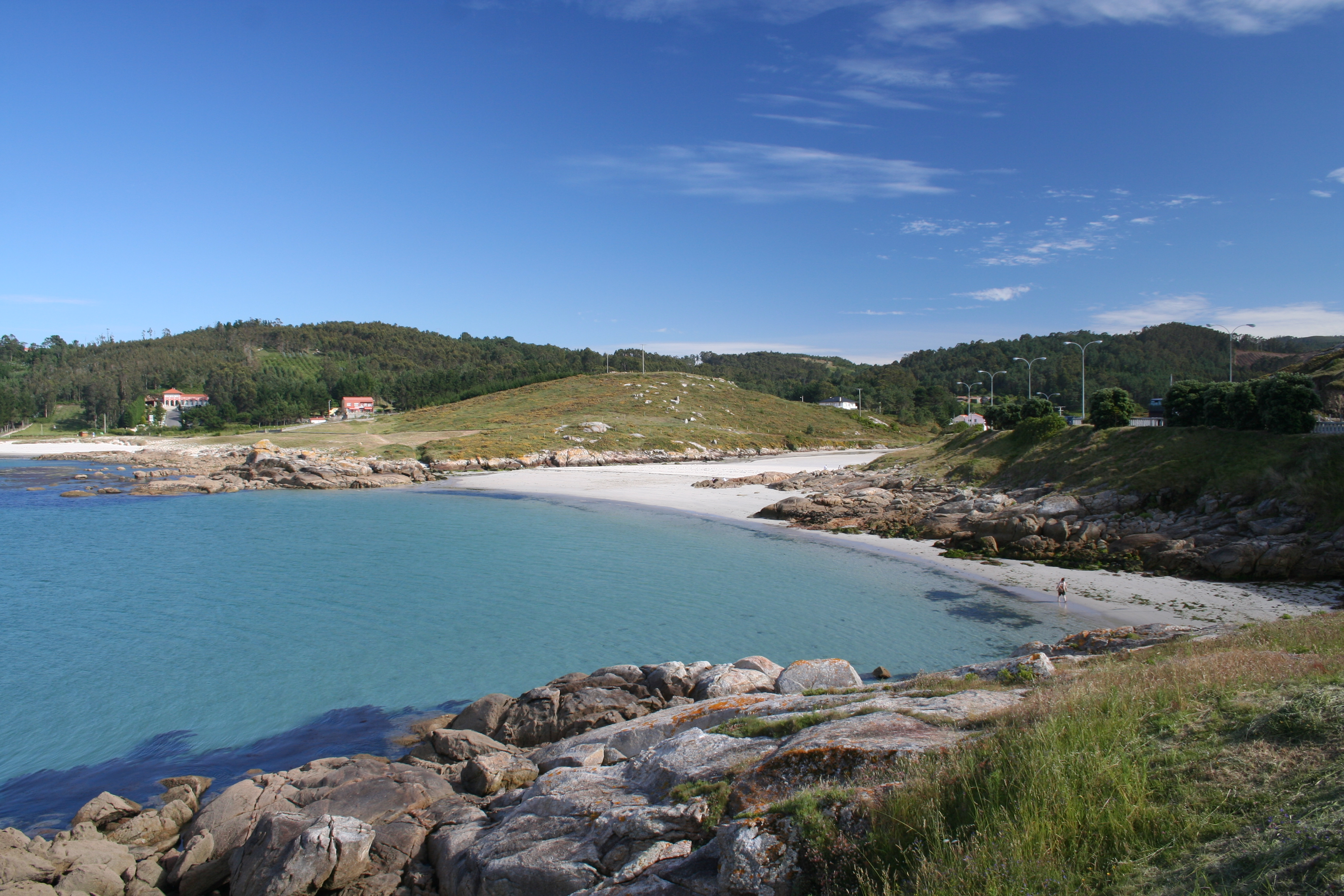
Muxía coastline

There was a serious oil spill involving the oil tanker Prestige along the Muxía part of the coast in November 2002, leaking about 70,000 gallons of oil into the Atlantic Ocean.

== History ==
In the 5th century and 6th century, Galicia was part of the Germanic Suevi kingdom. The Moors replaced the Germanic rulers, who were displaced in the 8th or 9th century by the king of Asturias.

The monastery near Muxía was named "Mosteiro de Moraime" to honor the saint, San Xiao de Moraime, and was established in the early 12th century. Not long after, in 1105, it was attacked and destroyed by Norman pirates, and later by Saxons. Alfonso Raimúndez, the future King and Emperor Alfonso VII of León and Castile, had lived in the area when he was younger and was educated by Pedro Froilaz de Traba.

Christians built a hermitage on this location at first, and later the church in the 17th century. On December 25, 2013, the Santuario da Virxe da Barca was destroyed by a fire caused by lightning.

Muxía was purchased by King Carlos of Castile (the Holy Roman Emperor Charles V) in the 16th century.

Muxía was destroyed in the 19th century by Napoleon's forces.

== Demography ==
From:INE Archiv

== Gallery ==
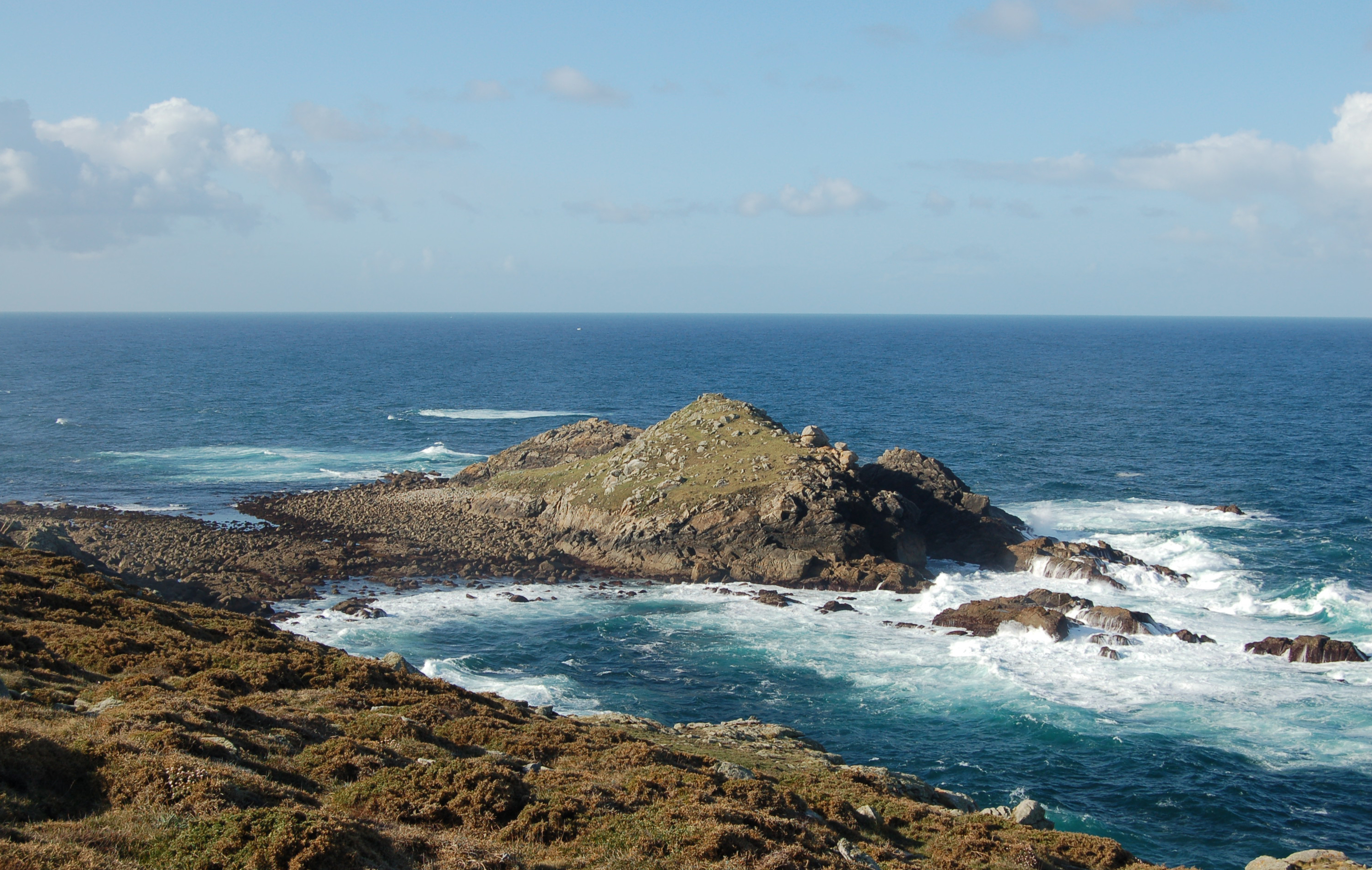
Castelo Island, Touriñán

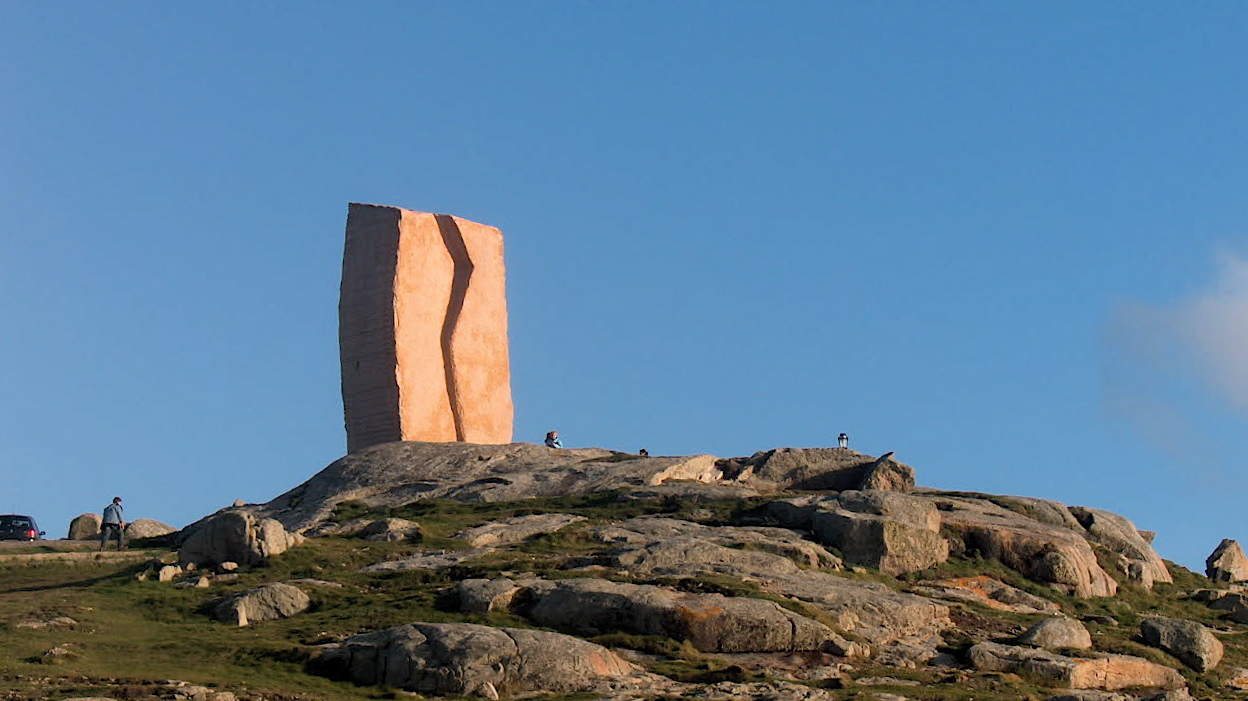
"A Ferida" (The Wound) sculpture by Alberto Bañuelos

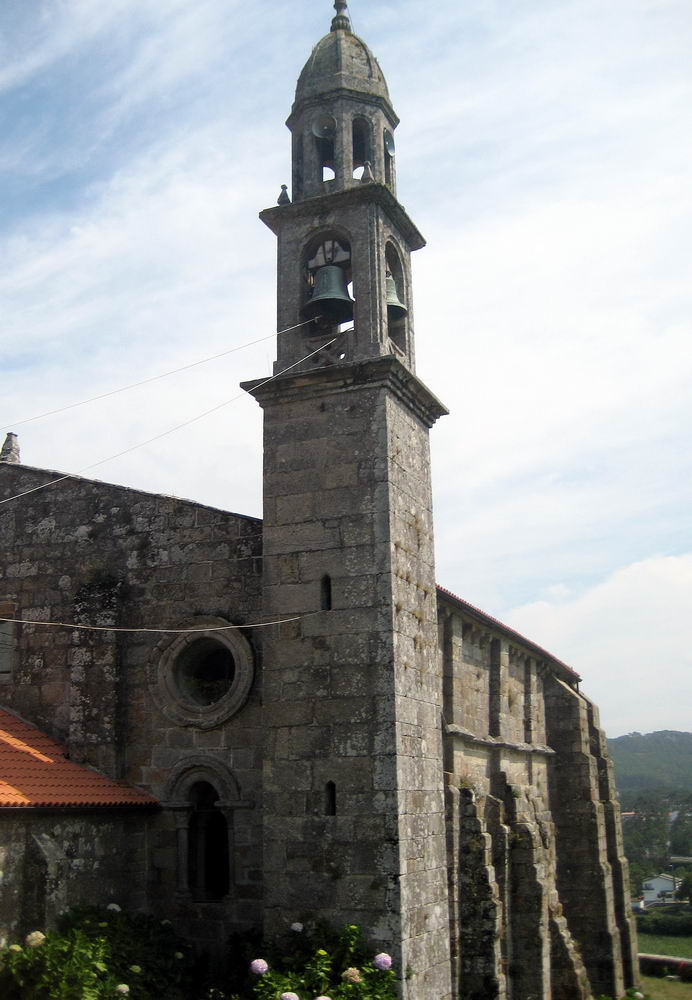
Church of San Xulián de Moraime

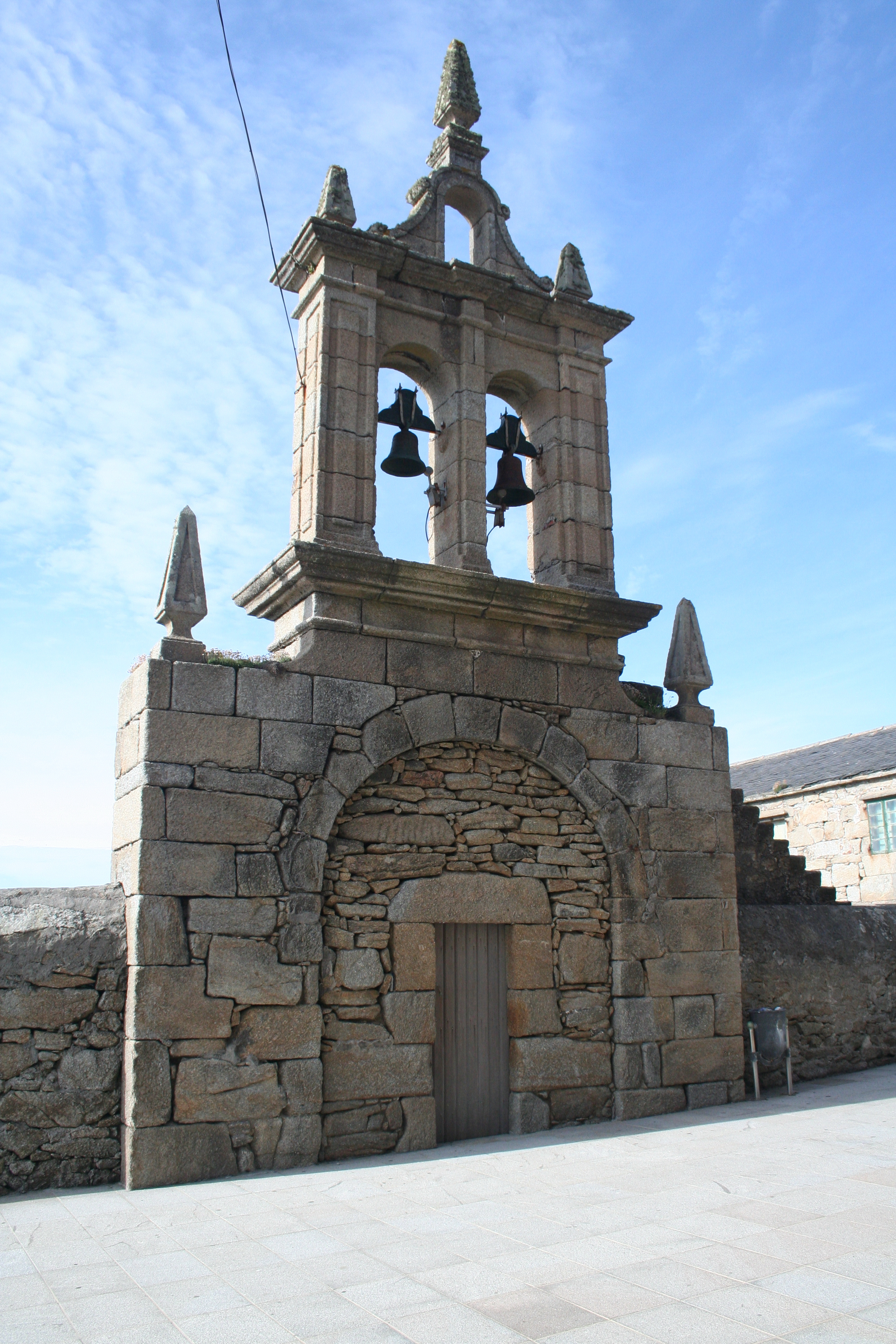
Doorway of the ancient Sanctuary of Virxe da Barca

== See also ==
List of municipalities in A Coruña
