= List of political action committees =

This is a list of political action committees (PAC) in the United States organized by the nature of each particular PAC's work.

== Aerospace ==
- BAE Systems
- Boeing
- Lockheed Martin

== Affiliated party ==
=== Democratic ===
- 43 Alumni for Biden
- American Bridge 21st Century – Washington, D.C.
- Asian American Action Fund – Washington, D.C.
- Democracy for America – Burlington, VT (Dissolved)
- DCCC (Democratic Congressional Campaign Committee) – Washington, D.C.
- DSCC (Democratic Senatorial Campaign Committee) – Washington, D.C.
- Democratic Governors Association – Washington, D.C.
- Democrats for Education Reform – New York, NY
- Democratic Legislative Campaign Committee (DLCC) – Washington, D.C.
- Future Forward PAC (Dissolved)
- MoveOn PAC – Berkeley CA
- National Committee for an Effective Congress – Washington, D.C.
- People's Action – Washington, D.C.
- Re:Power – St. Paul, MN
- WelcomePAC

=== Republican ===
- America First – Washington, D.C.
- America First Policies Action Fund – Arlington, VA
- America PAC - Marion, IA
- Americans For Prosperity – Arlington, VA
- Citizens United Political Victory Fund – Washington, D.C.
- Club for Growth PAC – Washington D.C.
- Committee to Defend the President PAC – Washington, D.C.
- Congressional Leadership Fund PAC
- John Bolton PAC – Washington, D.C.
- Maggie's List – Tallahassee, FL
- Move America Forward – Melbourne, FL
- National Conservative Political Action Committee – McLean, VA (Dissolved)
- Our Principles PAC – Alexandria, VA (Dissolved)
- Preserve America PAC
- Republican Main Street Partnership PAC – Washington, D.C.
- Restore Our Future
- Susan B. Anthony List PAC – Washington, D.C.

== Agribusiness ==
- American Veterinary Medical Association PAC – Washington, D.C.
- Dean Foods Company PAC – Dallas, TX
- Deere & Company PAC (John Deere PAC) – Moline, IL
- Farm Credit Council PAC – Washington, D.C.
- Koch, Inc. Action Fund – Wichita, KS
- Monsanto Company Citizenship Fund PAC – St. Louis, MO
- National Cattlemen's Beef Association PAC (NCBA-PAC) – Centennial, CO
- National Chicken Council PAC – Washington, D.C.
- Syngenta Corporation Employee PAC (Syngenta PAC) – Washington, D.C.
- Tyson Foods PAC (TYPAC) – Springdale, AR
- United Egg Producers PAC (Egg PAC) – Alpharetta, GA

== Alcoholic beverages ==
- Anheuser-Busch Companies PAC – St. Louis, MO
- Brown-Forman Corporation Non Partisan Committee on Responsible Government – Louisville, KY
- Distilled Spirits Council of the United States PAC (DISCUS PAC) – Washington, D.C.
- National Beer Wholesalers Association PAC (NBWA PAC) – Alexandria, VA
- Wine and Spirits Wholesalers of America PAC (WSWA-PAC) – Washington, D.C.

== Animals ==
- Humane Society Legislative Fund – Washington, D.C.

== Construction ==
- American Road and Transportation Builders Association PAC (ARTBA PAC) – Washington, D.C.

== Energy ==
=== Alternative energy ===
- American Wind Energy Association – Washington, D.C.
- Solar Energy Industries Association PAC – Washington, D.C.

=== Coal ===
- Arch Coal Political Action Committee (ARCHPAC) – St. Louis, MO
- COALPAC, A Political Action Committee of the National Mining Association – Washington, D.C.
- Foundation Coal Corporation Political Action Committee – Linthicum Heights, MD
- Murray Energy PAC – Pepper Pike, OH
- Peabody Energy Corp. PAC (Peabody PAC) – St. Louis, MO

=== Electric ===
- American Committee for Rural Electrification (ACRE) National Rural Electric Cooperative – Arlington, VA
- The American Electric Power Committee for Responsible Government – Columbus, OH
- Dominion Resources PAC – Richmond, VA
- Duke Energy PAC – Richmond, VA
- Exelon PAC – Chicago, IL
- Florida Power & Light Employees PAC (FPL PAC) – Juno Beach, FL

=== Nuclear ===
- Nuclear Energy Institute – Washington, D.C.

=== Oil and gas ===
- American Gas Association PAC – Washington, D.C.
- Bass Brothers Energy PAC – Fort Worth, TX
- Chevron Corporation Employees PAC – San Ramon, CA
- ConocoPhillips Spirit PAC – Bartlesville, OK
- ExxonMobil PAC – Indianapolis, IN
- KochPAC – Washington, D.C.
- Valero Energy PAC – San Antonio, TX
- The Williams Companies PAC – Washington, D.C.

== Entertainment ==
- Clear Channel Communications PAC – San Antonio, TX
- Comcast Corporation PAC – Philadelphia, PA
- DirecTV Group Fund (DIRECTTV PAC) – Washington, D.C.
- National Association oBroadcasters PAC (NABPAC) – Washington, D.C.
- National Cable & Telecommunications Association PAC (NCTA PAC) – Washington, D.C.
- Time Warner Cable PAC – Washington, D.C.
- The Walt Disney Company Employees PAC – Washington, D.C.

== Environment and natural resources ==
=== Environment ===
- League of Conservation Voters Action Fund – Washington, D.C.
- NextGen America PAC – San Francisco, CA
- Sierra Club Political Committee – San Francisco, CA

=== Natural resources ===
- MINEPAC, A Political Action Committee of the National Mining Association – Washington, D.C.
- Weyerhaeuser Company PAC – Detroit, MI

== Finance and insurance ==
=== Accounting ===
- American Institute of Certified Public Accountants PAC (AICPA PAC) – Durham, NC
- Deloitte & Touche Federal PAC – Washington, D.C.
- Ernst & Young PAC – Washington, D.C.
- KPMG Partners/Principals & Employees PAC – Washington, D.C.
- PricewaterhouseCoopers PAC – Washington, D.C.

=== Banking ===
- American Bankers Association PAC – Washington, D.C.
- American Express PAC (AXP PAC) – Washington, D.C.
- American Financial Services Association PAC (AFSA PAC) – Washington, D.C.
- Bank of America Federal PAC – Washington, D.C.
- Capital One Associates PAC – McLean, VA
- Cash America International PAC – Fort Worth, TX
- Citigroup, Inc. PAC – Washington, D.C.
- Credit Suisse Securities PAC – Washington, D.C.
- Cryptocurrency Alliance Super PAC – Washington, D.C.
- Deutsche Bank Americas Corp / Taunus Corporation PAC – Washington, D.C.
- Goldman Sachs PAC – Washington, D.C.
- HSBC North America Political Action Committee (H-PAC) – Mettawa, IL
- Independent Community Bankers of America PAC – Washington, D.C.
- Investment Company Institute PAC (ICI PAC) – Washington, D.C.
- MasterCard Inc. Employees PAC – Purchase, NY
- Morgan Stanley PAC – Washington, D.C.
- Sallie Mae PAC – Reston, VA
- Securities Industry and Financial Markets Association PAC (SIFMA PAC) – Washington, D.C.
- UBS Americas Fund for Better Government – Stamford, CT

=== Insurance ===
- AFLAC PAC – Columbus, GA
- America’s Health Insurance Plans PAC (AHIP PAC) – Washington, D.C.
- Massachusetts Mutual Life Insurance PAC – Springfield, MA
- MetLife Employee Political Participation Fund – New York, NY
- National Association of Health Underwriters PAC (HUPAC) – Arlington, VA
- New York Life Insurance Company PAC – New York, NY
- USAA Employees PAC – San Antonio, TX

== Food and beverage ==
- American Beverage Association PAC – Washington, D.C.
- American Meat Institute PAC – Washington, D.C.
- Coca-Cola Company Non-Partisan Committee on Good Government – Atlanta, GA
- ConAgra Foods Good Government Committee – Omaha, NE
- Flowers Foods Industries PAC – Thomasville, GA
- Food Marketing Institute PAC (FOODPAC) (FOODPACE) – Arlington, VA
- General Mills PAC – Minneapolis, MN
- Kraft Foods PAC (KRAFTPAC) – Washington, D.C.
- McDonald's Corporation PAC – Oak Brook, IL
- National Restaurant Association PAC (NRA-PAC) – Washington, D.C.
- OSI Restaurant Partners PAC – Tampa, FL
- PepsiCo Concerned Citizens Fund – Purchase, NY
- Taco Political Action Committee (TACO PAC) – Shawnee Mission, KS
- United Food and Commercial Workers Union — Washington, D.C.
- Wendy's/Arby's Group PAC – Dublin, OH

== Foreign affairs ==
- Alliance 4 American Leadership PAC - Washington, D.C.
- Hudson Institute PAC – New York, NY
- Truman Project PAC – Washington, D.C.
- VoteVets.org – Washington, D.C.
- United States India Political Action Committee – Washington, D.C.
- A New Policy PAC - Washington, D.C.

=== U.S.-Israel relations ===
- AIPAC – Washington, D.C.
- American Priorities - Wilmington, DE
- Anti-Zionist America PAC
- Citizens Against AIPAC Corruption
- Joint Action Committee for Political Affairs – Washington, D.C.
- J Street PAC – Washington, D.C.
- NORPAC – Englewood Cliffs, NJ
- PAL PAC
- Pro-Israel America PAC – Washington, D.C.

== Gun rights ==
- Gun Owners of America Political Victory Fund (GOA-PVF) – Springfield, VA
- National Rifle Association - Political Victory Fund (NRA-PVF) – Arlington, VA

== Health care ==
=== Hospitals and care facilities ===
- American Healthcare Association PAC – Washington, D.C.
- American Hospital Association PAC – Washington, D.C.
- American Seniors Housing PAC – Washington, D.C.

=== Pharmaceutical and biotech ===
- Abbott Laboratories Employees PAC – Abbott Park, IL
- AmGen, Inc. PAC – Washington, D.C.
- Eli Lilly and Company PAC – Indianapolis, IN
- Genentech Inc Political Action Committee
- GlaxoSmithKline PAC – Residential Triangle Park, NC
- Johnson & Johnson PAC (JJPAC) – New Brunswick, NJ
- MerckPAC – Washington, D.C.
- Pfizer Inc. PAC (PfizerPAC) – New York, NY
- Pharmaceutical Research and Manufacturers of America Better Government Committee (PhRMA) – Washington, D.C.

=== Providers ===
- American Academy of Dermatology PAC (SkinPAC) – Washington, D.C.
- American Academy of Family Physicians PAC (FamMedPAC) – Washington, D.C.
- American Association of Orthopaedic Surgeons PAC (The Orthopaedic PAC) – Washington, D.C.
- American College of Pathology PAC (Path-PAC) – Milwaukee, WI
- American College of Radiology PAC (RadPAC) – Reston, VA
- American Dental Association PAC (ADPAC) – Washington, D.C.
- American Medical Association PAC (AmPAC) – Washington, D.C.
- American Optometric Association PAC (AOA PAC) – Alexandria, VA
- American Physical Therapy Association PAC (PT-PAC) – Alexandria, VA
- American Society of Anesthesiologists PAC (ASAPAC) – Park Ridge, IL
- Certified Registered Nurse Anesthetist PAC (CRNA-PAC) – Washington, D.C.
- National Emergency Medicine PAC (NEMPAC) – Irving, TX

== Ideology ==
=== Bipartisanship or nonpartisanship ===
- Bipartisan Policy Center Action

=== Conservative ===
- America First Policies Action Fund – Arlington, VA
- American Crossroads – Washington, D.C.
- Citizens for Sanity
- Clearpath Solutions – Washington, D.C.
- Eagle Forum – Alton, IL
- Freedom Works – Alexandria, VA (Dissolved)
- Freedom Partners – Alexandria, VA (Dissolved)
- Right Side PAC (Dissolved)
- TitoPac – Prince William Co., VA (Tito the Builder controlled)

=== Liberal ===
- ActBlue — Somerville, MA
- American Bridge – Washington, D.C. (David Brock PAC)
- AllOfUs – Washington, D.C. (Dissolved)
- America Votes – Washington, D.C.
- Democracy Alliance – Washington, D.C.
- Democracy Spring – Washington, D.C. (Dissolved)
- Democratic Socialists of America – Washington, D.C.
- Free Press Action – Washington, D.C.
- Fwd.us – Washington, D.C.
- Giffords Courage Action Fund – Washington, D.C.
- Issue One – Washington, D.C.
- Justice Democrats – Los Angeles, CA
- LCV PAC – Washington, D.C.
- Media Matters for America PAC – Washington, D.C.
- Onward Together – Washington, D.C.
- Our Revolution – Knoxville, TN
- People for the American Way – Washington, D.C.
- Progressive Caucus – Washington, D.C.
- Progressive Change Campaign Committee – Washington, D.C.
- Progressive Congress Action Fund – Washington, D.C.
- Progressive Victory – Nationwide
- ProgressNow – Washington, D.C.
- Project Vote – Washington, D.C.
- Roosevelt Institute – New York, NY
- Tax Policy Center – Washington, D.C.
- Ultraviolet – Washington, D.C.
- Working Families Party – Washington, D.C.
- Emerge America - Washington, D.C.

=== Other ===
- Credo Super PAC – Washington, D.C. (part of Working Assets group)
- Demand Progress – Washington, D.C.
- Demos Action PAC – New York, NY
- Liberty For All Political Action Committee – Austin, TX
- Lyndon LaRouche PAC (LaRouchePAC) – Leesburg, VA
- Our Principles PAC – Alexandria, VA (Dissolved)
- Youth Political Awareness PAC - San Diego, CA. Supplements kindergarten to 8th grade education.

== Labor ==
- Carpenters Legislative Improvement Committee – Washington, D.C.
- IBEW PAC – Washington, D.C.
- International Union of Operating Engineers (IUOE) Political Education Committee – Washington, D.C.
- Laborers International Union of North America (LIUNA) PAC – Washington, D.C.
- National Association of Letter Carriers — Washington, D.C.
- National Association of Social Workers PACE - Washington, D.C.
- Non-Partisan Political League of the International Association of Machinists and Aerospace Workers – Upper Marlboro, MD
- Service Employees International Union Committee on Political Education (SEIU COPE) – Washington, D.C.
- Transport Workers Union Political Contributions Committee – New York, NY
- Transportation Communications International Union Responsible Citizens Political League – Rockville, MD
- Working America PAC – Washington, D.C.

== Leadership ==
=== Executive branch ===
- Donald Trump – MAGA Inc. Super PAC, Save America PAC – Arlington, VA

=== House leadership ===
- Former House Assistant Democratic Leader James Clyburn – BRIDGE PAC – Washington, D.C.
- Former Majority Leader Steny Hoyer – AmeriPAC – Washington, D.C.
- Former Speaker of the House Kevin McCarthy – Majority Committee PAC (MC PAC) – Bakersfield, CA
- Speaker Emerita (Former Speaker of the House) Nancy Pelosi – PAC to the Future – Washington, D.C.
- Majority Leader Steve Scalise – Eye of the Tiger Pac – Arlington, VA

=== House members ===
- Pete Aguilar – Progressive Majority PAC – CA-LUV PAC – Washington, D.C.
- Katherine Clark – Fair Shot PAC – Boston, MA
- Debbie Dingell – Wolverine PAC – Washington, D.C.
- Tom Emmer – Electing Majority Making Effective Republicans – Anoka, MN
- Darrell Issa – Invest in a Safe & Secure America PAC (IssaPAC) – Vista, CA
- Pramila Jayapal – Medicare for All PAC – Seattle, WA
- Hakeem Jeffries – Jobs Education & Families First PAC – Washington, D.C.
- Patrick McHenry – Innovation PAC — Alexandria, VA
- Seth Moulton — Serve America PAC — Salem, MA
- Alexandria Ocasio-Cortez – Courage to Change PAC – Bronx, NY
- Frank Pallone – SHORE PAC – Long Branch, NJ
- Adam Schiff – Frontline USA – Los Angeles, CA
- Pete Sessions – People for Enterprise, Trade and Economic Growth – Alexandria, VA
- Elise Stefanik – E-PAC – Glen Falls, NY
- Bennie G. Thompson – Secure PAC – Bolton, MS
- Nydia M. Velazquez – Progress PAC – Gaithersburg, MD
- Debbie Wasserman Schultz – Democrats Win Seats – Weston, FL

=== Senate leadership ===
- Democratic Whip Dick Durbin – Prairie PAC – Washington, D.C.
- Mitch McConnell – Bluegrass Committee – Alexandria, VA
- Minority Leader Chuck Schumer – Impact – New York, NY
- Majority Leader John Thune – Heartland Values PAC – Sioux Falls, SD

=== Senators ===
- Mitch McConnell – Bluegrass Committee – Alexandria, VA
- John Cornyn – Alamo PAC – Austin, TX
- Chuck Grassley – Hawkeye PAC – Des Moines, IA
- Amy Klobuchar – Follow the North Star Fund – Minneapolis, MN
- Rand Paul – Human Action – Tucson, AZ
- Chris Van Hollen – Victory Now PAC – Kensington, MD
- Mark R. Warner – Forward Together PAC – Alexandria, VA

=== Former elected and public officials ===
- Max Baucus – Glacier PAC – Missoula, MT
- Robert F. Benett – SNOWPAC – Salt Lake City, UT
- Roy Blunt – Rely on Your Beliefs Fund (ROYB Fund) – Tacoma, WA
- John Boehner – The Freedom Project – Washington, D.C.
- Mo Brooks – Make Opportunity (MO) PAC – Huntsville, AL
- Sherrod Brown – America Works PAC – Washington, D.C.
- Barbara Boxer – PAC for a Change – Los Angeles, CA
- Liz Cheney – Cowboy PAC – Arlington, VA
- Hillary Clinton – HILLPAC – Washington, D.C.
- Joe Crowley – Jobs, Opportunity & Education PAC (JoePAC) – Elmhurst, NY
- Kent Conrad – DAKPAC – Washington, D.C.
- John Conyers – America Forward PAC – Washington, D.C.
- Mitch Daniels – Aiming Higher PAC
- Jim DeMint – Senate Conservatives Fund – Alexandria, VA
- Chris Dodd – Citizens for Hope, Responsibility, Independence & Service (Chris PAC) – Washington, D.C.
- Byron Dorgan – Great Plains Leadership Fund – Washington, D.C.
- Rahm Emanuel – Our Common Values PAC – Chicago, IL
- Dianne Feinstein – Fund for the Majority – Burbank, CA
- Bob Filner – San Diego PAC – San Diego, CA
- Newt Gingrich – American Solutions PAC – Alexandria, VA
- Nikki Haley – SFA Fund Inc. – Washington, D.C.
- Tom Harkin – To Organize a Majority PAC (TomPAC) – Des Moines, IA
- Mike Huckabee – Huck PAC – Little Rock, AR
- Jon Huntsman – HorizonPac/H-PAC – Washington, D.C.
- Daniel Inouye – DANPAC – Honolulu, HI
- John Kerry – Campaign for Our Country – Washington, D.C.
- Minority Whip John Kyl – Senate Majority Fund – Washington, D.C.
- Mary Landrieu – Jazz PAC – Washington, D.C.
- Patrick Leahy – Green Mountain PAC – Montpelier, VT
- Joe Lieberman – Reuniting Our Country – Washington, D.C.
- Blanche Lincoln – Leadership in the New Century (LINC PAC) – Little Rock, AR
- John McCain – Country First PAC – Alexandria, VA
- Robert Menendez – New Millennium PAC – Union City, NJ
- David R. Obey – Committee for a Progressive Congress – Washington, D.C.
- Sarah Palin – SarahPAC – Arlington, VA
- Ron Paul – Liberty PAC – Lake Jackson, TX
- Mark Pryor – Priority PAC – Little Rock, AR
- Tim Pawlenty – Freedom First – St. Paul, MN
- Nick Rahall – 3T PAC – Beckley, WV
- Charles Rangel – National Leadership PAC – New York, NY
- Mitt Romney – Free & Strong America PAC – Lexington, MA
- Rick Santorum – America's Foundation PAC – Downingtown, PA
- Ike Skelton – The Show-Me Fund – Blue Bell, PA
- John M. Spratt, Jr. – Palmetto PAC – Bethesda, MD
- Henry Waxman – LA PAC – Los Angeles, CA

== Legal ==
- American Association for Justice – Washington, D.C.
- DLA Piper PAC – Washington, D.C.
- Greenberg Traurig PAC – Miami, FL
- Holland & Knight Committee for Effective Government – Washington, D.C.
- K&L Gates PAC – Washington, D.C.
- Patton Boggs PAC – Washington, D.C.
- Sonnenschein, Nath & Rosenthal PAC (Sonnenschein PAC) – Washington, D.C.

== Manufacturing ==
- 3M Company PAC – St. Paul, MN
- General Electric PAC (GEPAC) – Washington, D.C.
- Honeywell International PAC – Washington, D.C.
- Procter & Gamble Good Government Committee (P&G PAC) – Cincinnati, OH
- The Shaw Group PAC – Washington, D.C.

== Real estate ==
- National Apartment Association PAC (NAAPAC) – Arlington, VA
- National Association of Realtors PAC – Chicago, IL
- Real Estate Roundtable PAC (REALPAC) – Washington, D.C.

== Retailers ==
- CVS Caremark Employees PAC – Washington, D.C.
- The Home Depot PAC – Washington, D.C.
- International Council of Shopping Centers PAC (ICSC PAC) – Washington, D.C.
- Target Citizens Political Forum – Minneapolis, MN
- Wal-Mart Stores PAC For Responsible Government – Washington, D.C.

== Religious/ethnic ==
- Advancement Project PAC – Washington, D.C.
- Asian American Action Fund (pro-democratic Asian-American group) – Washington, D.C.
- Black Economic Alliance (African American business leaders) – Boston, MA
- Color of Change – Washington, D.C.
- Congressional Asian Pacific American Caucus Leadership PAC – Washington, D.C.
- Defend Texas Liberty
- Indian Americans for Freedom – Carol Stream, IL
- Latino Victory PAC – Washington, D.C.
- Republican Jewish Coalition – Washington, D.C.
- United We Dream PAC – Washington, D.C.
- US-Cuba Democracy PAC – Hialeah, FL
- Voto Latino Super PAC – Washington, D.C.

== Social issues ==
=== Abortion ===
- RBG PAC

==== Pro-abortion rights ====
- EMILY's List – Washington, D.C.
- NARAL Pro-Choice America PAC – Washington, D.C.
- Planned Parenthood Action Fund – New York, NY
- PODER PAC
- The Wish List – Alexandria, VA
- Republicans for Choice

==== Anti-abortion rights ====
- Susan B. Anthony Pro-Life America
- American Life League

=== LGBTQ ===
==== Pro-LGBTQ ====
- Equality PAC – Washington, D.C.
- Gay & Lesbian Victory Fund – Washington, D.C.
- Human Rights Campaign PAC – Washington, D.C.
- LPAC – Washington, D.C.
- Pride PAC – San Francisco, CA

==== Anti-LGBTQ ====
- Defend Texas Liberty

=== Marijuana ===
- Marijuana Policy Project – Washington, D.C.
- National Organization for the Reform of Marijuana Laws (NORML) – Washington, D.C.

== Tobacco ==
- Altria PAC (ALTRIAPAC) – Washington, D.C.
- Lorillard Tobacco Company Public Affairs Committee – Greensboro, NC
- RJ Reynolds PAC – Winston-Salem, NC
- US Smokeless Tobacco Executives Administrators and Managers PAC – Washington, D.C.

== Transportation ==
=== Air ===
- Aircraft Owners and Pilots Association PAC – Frederick, MD
- American Airlines PAC – Washington, D.C.
- Continental Airlines Employee Fund for a Better America – Houston, TX
- Delta Air Lines PAC – Washington, D.C.
- Federal Express PAC (FEDEXPAC) – Memphis, TN
- United Parcel Service PAC (UPSPAC) – Atlanta, GA

=== Freight rail ===
- American Short Line and Regional Railroad Association PAC (ASLRRA PAC) – Washington, D.C.
- Association of American Railroads PAC (RAILPAC) – Washington, D.C.
- Burlington Northern Santa Fe Corporation RailPac (BNSF RailPAC) – Fort Worth, TX
- CSX Corporation Good Government Fund – Washington, D.C.
- Norfolk Southern Corporation Good Government Fund – Norfolk, VA
- Union Pacific Corporation Fund for a Better Government – Washington, D.C.

=== Road ===
- National Limousine Association PAC (NLA) – Marlton, NJ

== See also ==
- Super PAC
- Political action committee
- Lobbying in the United States
- Citizens United v. FEC
