= David Murray =

David Murray may refer to:

== Business ==
- David Murray (Australian businessman) (born 1949), CEO of the Commonwealth Bank of Australia
- Sir David Murray (Scottish businessman) (born 1951), chairman of Rangers Football Club
- David Isaac Murray (born 1983), American entrepreneur and computer scientist

== Entertainment ==
- Sir David Murray (painter) (1849–1933), Scottish landscape painter
- David Murray (saxophonist) (born 1955), American jazz saxophonist and clarinetist
- Dave Murray (musician) (born 1956), British guitarist for the heavy metal band Iron Maiden
- David Murray (actor) (born 1970), Irish actor

== Politics ==
- David Murray, 1st Viscount of Stormont (died 1631), Scottish courtier
- Sir David Murray (poet) (1567–1629), favourite of Henry, Prince of Wales
- David Murray, 5th Viscount of Stormont (1665–1731), Scottish peer
- David Murray, 6th Viscount of Stormont (c. 1690–1748), Scottish peer
- David Murray, 2nd Earl of Mansfield (1727–1796), 7th Viscount of Stormont
- David Murray (1748–1794), MP for Peeblesshire and New Radnor
- David William Murray, 3rd Earl of Mansfield (1777–1840), British army officer and peer
- David Murray (South Australian politician) (1829–1907), member of lower house in the 1870s, upper house 1882 to 1891
- Sir David King Murray, Lord Birnam (1884–1955), Scottish politician and judge
- David Murray (New South Wales politician) (1885–1928), member of the New South Wales Legislative Assembly
- David Murray (Scottish politician) (1900–?), Scottish nationalist and Liberal Party politician

== Sports ==
=== Association football (soccer) ===
- David Murray (footballer, born 1882) (1882–1915), Scottish football player for Liverpool and Everton
- David Murray (soccer, born 1901) (1901–1992), South African football player for Bristol Rovers
- David Murray (footballer, born 1967), English football player for Chester City

=== Other sports ===
- David Murry (born 1957), American auto racing driver
- David Murray (racing driver) (1909–1973), Scottish Formula One driver
- David Murray (water polo) (1925–2020), British Olympic water polo player
- David Murray (cricketer) (1950–2022), West Indian cricketer
- Dave Murray (skier) (1953–1990), Canadian alpine skier
- David Murray (Australian footballer) (born 1955), Australian footballer for Melbourne
- Dave Murray (American football), American football coach and player

== Other ==
- David Murray (bishop), Anglican bishop
- David Murray (educator) (1830–1905), American educator and government adviser in Meiji period Japan
- David Murray (solicitor, born 1842) (1842–1928), Scottish lawyer, antiquarian, and bibliophile
- David Christie Murray (1847–1907), English journalist and writer
- David Stark Murray (1900–1977), British president of the Socialist Medical Association
- David Murray (RAF officer) (born 1963), British air marshal
- David Leslie Murray (1888–1962), British author and editor of the Times Literary Supplement
- Sir David Murray, 4th Baronet (died 1769), Scottish Jacobite soldier.
- David Murray, "The 8-Bit Guy", American retrocomputing enthusiast and YouTuber
