= SFA =

SFA may refer to:

== In science and technology ==
=== In medicine ===
- Superficial femoral artery, a large artery in the thigh

=== In chemistry ===
- Saturated fatty acid, a type of fatty acid with no double bonds
- Segmented flow analysis, a technique and class of instrument used in chemical analysis
- Sodium fluoroacetate, an organofluorine chemical compound, and the sodium salt of fluoroacetic acid

=== In physical science and engineering ===
- Substance flow analysis, a method of analyzing the flows of a material in a well-defined system
- Surface forces apparatus, a scientific instrument and technique
- Svenska Flygmotor Aktiebolaget late 1940s Swedish aero-engine manufacturer

=== Other uses in science and technology ===
- Sales force automation, information systems used in customer relationship marketing
- Simple feature access, a standard storage and access model for geographical data
- Single Frequency Approach, an aviation procedure
- Stochastic Frontier Analysis, a method of economic modeling
- Striker Fired Action, in firearms

== Organizations ==
=== In education ===
- Sabena Flight Academy, Belgium
- Skills Funding Agency, England
- Stephen F. Austin State University, Nacogdoches, Texas, US
- Success for All, school curricula, US

=== Other organizations ===
- Space Force Association
- Special Forces Association
- Free Syrian Army
  - Maghaweir al-Thowra, officially the Syrian Free Army
- Somali Film Agency, a film regulatory body
- Student/Farmworker Alliance, Immokalee, Florida, US
- Swedish Fortifications Agency
- Singapore Food Agency
- SFA Fund Inc.

== Sports ==
- Scottish Football Association, the football governing body of Scotland
- Sudan Football Association, the football governing body of Sudan
- Somaliland Football Association, the football governing body of Somaliland
- Sarawak FA, a Malaysian association football club
- Selangor FA, a Malaysian association football club
- Stephen F. Austin Lumberjacks and Ladyjacks, the athletic program of Stephen F. Austin State University

== Other uses ==
- Jonathan Davis and the SFA, an American metal band
- Super Furry Animals, a Welsh rock band
- Stratford International station
- Six Flags America, an amusement park in Bowie, MD
- Six Flags AstroWorld, a former amusement park located in Houston, Texas
- Stillbirth Foundation Australia
