= Senator Hotel =

- Hotel Senator
- U.S. National Register of Historic Places
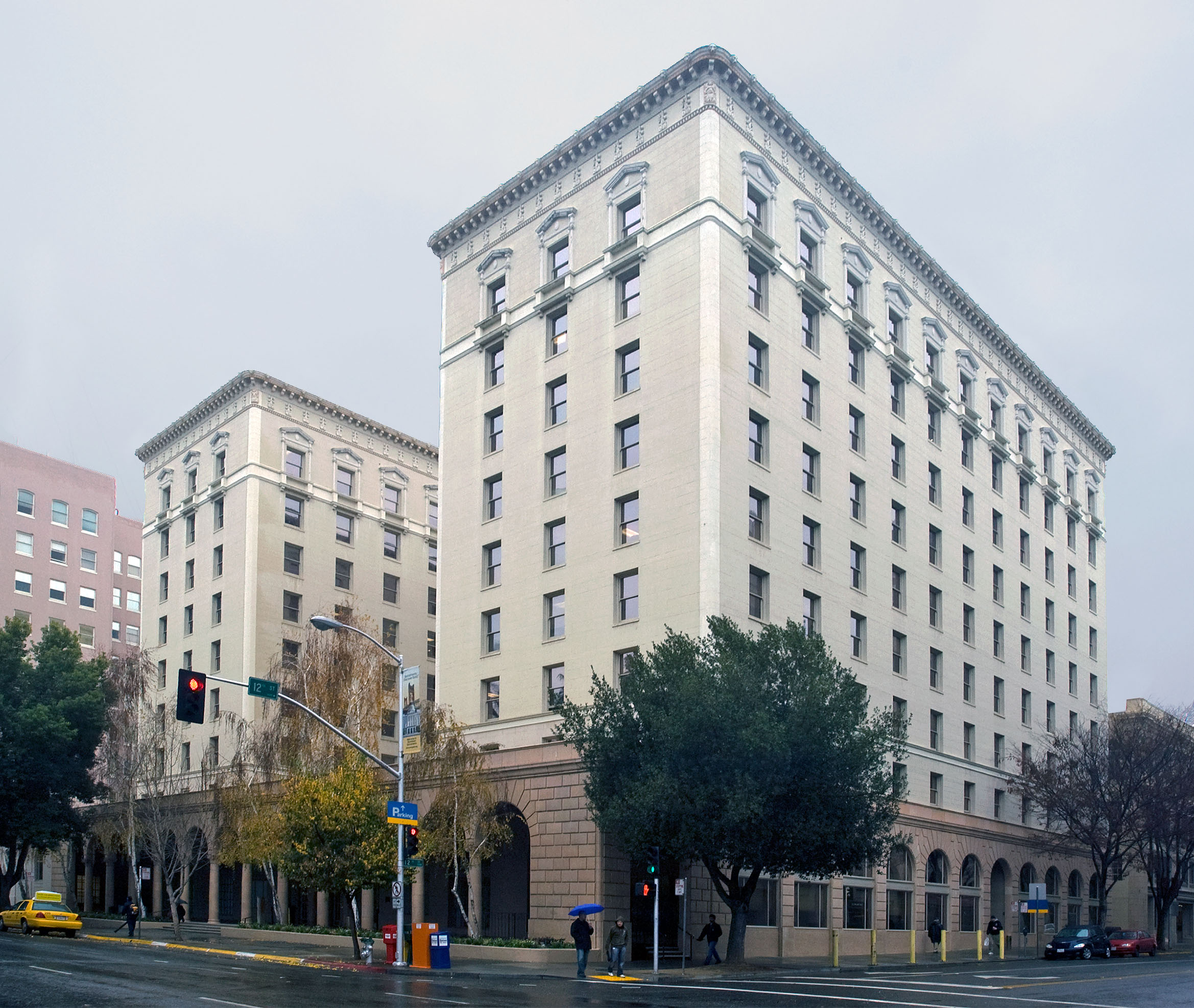

- Location within Sacramento, California Location within California Location within the United States
- Location: 1121 L Street, Sacramento, California
- Coordinates: 38°34′39″N 121°29′31″W
- Area: .87 acres (0.35 ha)
- Built: 1923–1924
- Architect: Kenneth MacDonald and G. Albert Lansburgh
- Architectural style: Renaissance Revival architecture
- NRHP reference No.: 79003459
- Added to NRHP: May 30, 1979

The Senator Hotel (officially Hotel Senator) (1924–1979) was a nine-story, 400-room Italian Renaissance-style hotel in Sacramento, California located at 12th and L streets across from the California State Capitol building that served as a nexus of California political and social activity for more than 50 years. Opened in 1924, the Senator Hotel was where Arthur Samish, one of the most influential and powerful individual lobbyists in the history of California, maintained a suite during the 1930s and 1940s. President Gerald Ford spent the night at the Senator Hotel before the September 5, 1975, assassination attempt on him by cultist Manson family disciple Squeaky Fromme. Although the Senator Hotel was listed on the National Register of Historic Places in May 1979, the hotel was closed two months later and shuttered with panels placed over the windows that same year. The structure was renovated and then reopened in 1983 as an office building under the name Senator Hotel Office Building, giving lobbyists short-walking-distance access to California's state politicians.

== Features ==
The Senator Hotel building is divided into two main reinforced-concrete masses, each nine stories in height and connected by a lobby building. Stylistically modeled after the Palazzo Farnese in Florence, Italy and positioned to front on Sacramento's L Street, the L Street facade measures 165 feet (50 m) and includes a colonnaded archway along the entire front and side facades. When the building was opened in 1924, its archway system was covered in a peach-colored terra cotta that imitated "massive, smooth marble blocks" through deep etching and had an open front facade that served as a veranda for hotel guests. That area later was enclosed in glass.

Originally, the hotel lobby resembled the 16th century Palazzo Farnese courtyard in Rome, Italy. To reach the skylight lit lobby, guests would enter from L Street through hand-painted decorated main doors and pass through "a colonnade of rough plastered walls covered with gold beneath tints of blue". Optionally, the guest could travel straight from the entry doors, across the lobby, to the far end of the lobby and climb one of two winding staircases to reach a balcony floor extending around and overlooking the lobby. The stair stick spindles lining the stairway sides were pastel paint shaded ornamental ironworks.

As a commercial establishment, the Senator Hotel not only offered lodging to travelers and sometimes to permanent residents, it also included restaurants, meeting rooms, and was available to the general public. When the hotel opened in 1924, its vaudeville theater featured the band, The Syncopating Senators. The Senator Hotel had its own orchestra and featured an 86 feet (26 m) bar designed by American architect G. Albert Lansburgh for the hotel's Empire Room. In January 1937, a mural depicting the abdication of Britain's King Edward VIII in December 1936 to marry American divorcée and socialite, Wallis Simpson, was added to the bar. This mural came at a time when the abdication crisis was world news and brought protest from Sacramento's Delphian Society, who claimed that the mural showed bad judgment in its positive portrayal of the King and the divorcée and negative portrayal of United Kingdom Prime Minister Baldwin and the Archbishop of Canterbury, the senior bishop and principal leader of the Church of England.

Along with the Empire Room, the Senator Hotel included the Peacock Room that served as a tea room for women and the Florentine Dining Room, which was designed to look like the Stone Room in the Palazzo Farnese and to serve as the hotel's main dining room. The hotel also included the Roman Banquet Hall, used as a ceremonial dining area for 125 to 150 people. Many of these areas were redesigned in 1954. As of 2012, the building had 147,000 square feet (14,000 m^{2}) of space and tenants in each office could listen in on any proceedings occurring in the California Assembly, Senate, or any committee hearing rooms in the state Capitol via a squawk box.

== History ==
The Senator Hotel's 1920s opening came at an important time in Sacramento, California. The city's current charter was adopted by voters in 1920, establishing a city council-and-manager form of government still used today. In 1923, voters approved the creation the Sacramento Municipal Utility District (SMUD), a customer-owned utility that provides electricity to Sacramento County. The year following the creation of SMUD, 1924, brought several events in Sacramento: Standard Oil executive Verne McGeorge established McGeorge School of Law, American department store Weinstock & Lubin opened at 12th and K street, Sacramento's drinking water became filtered and treated drinking water, and Sacramento boxer Georgie Lee fought Francisco Guilledo, a Filipino professional boxer known as Pancho Villa, at Sacramento's L Street Auditorium on March 21 for the flyweight boxing championship of the world.

Designed by architect Kenneth MacDonald with collaboration from theater architect G. Albert Lansburgh, the $2 million Senator Hotel was built in 1923–1924 and opened in late August 1924 at 1121 L Street to provide lodging and meeting rooms to California's state politicians and others having government and commercial business in Sacramento. Along with other 12th Street structures, such as the state Capitol, Francesca Apartments, erected in 1924, Weinstock's department store, and a Bank of America, the Senator Hotel became part of one of California's then-newest and trendiest commercial shopping centers.

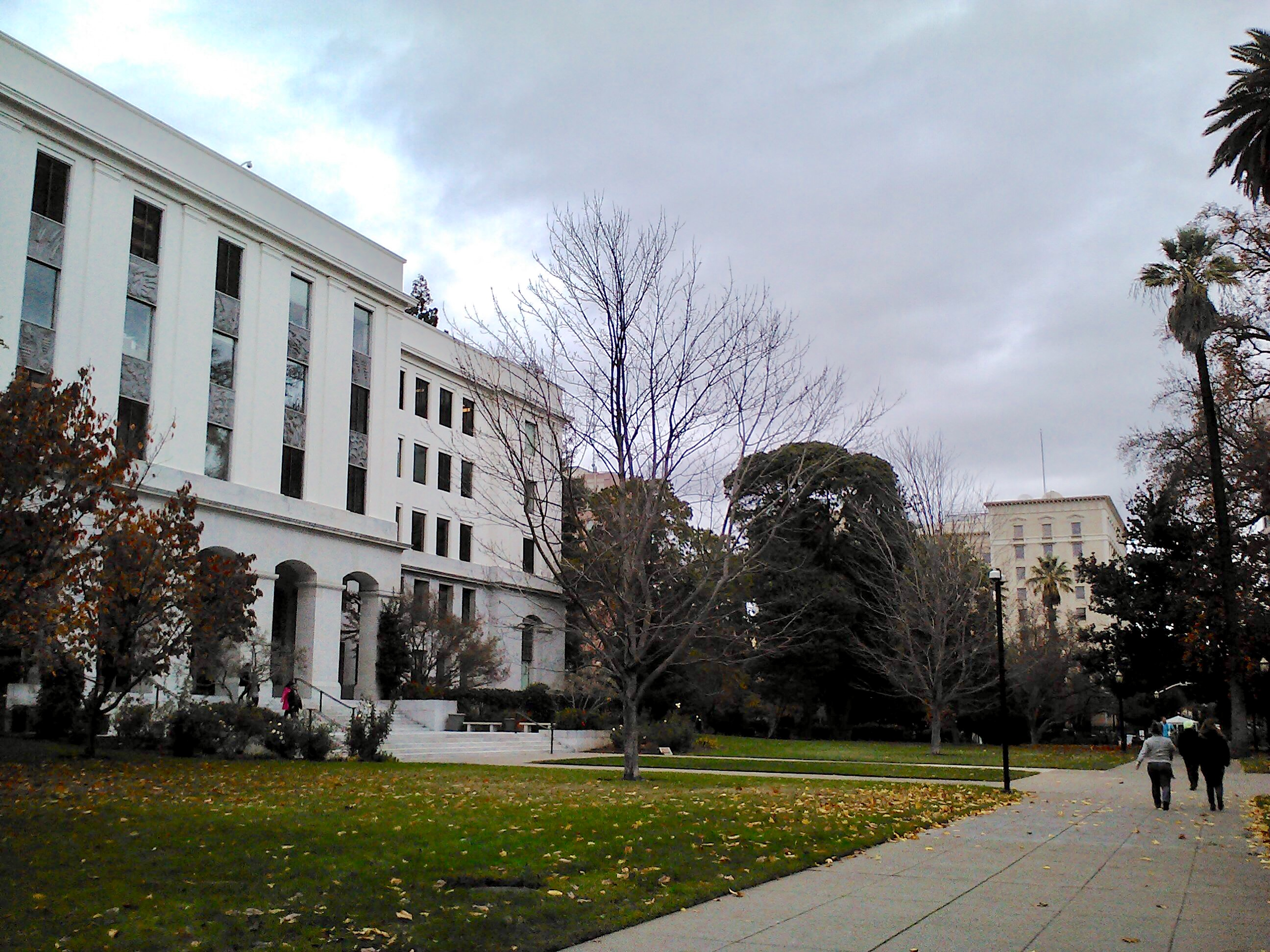
The East Entrance of the California State Capitol looking north with the Senator Hotel in the background.

Silent film star Buster Keaton stayed at the hotel with his production company in the summer of 1927 while filming the 1928 feature-length comedy Steamboat Bill, Jr. A few months later, adventure pilot Charles Lindbergh was honored in the hotel's Florentine Room for his May 1927 historic flight from New York to Paris, France. From the 1930s to the 1950s, the Senator Hotel served as the center of political activity in the capital. Legislators and lobbyists would sit in wicker chairs in the building's lobby, making one political deal after another deal regarding oil, liquor, railroading, electric utilities, and other areas. Max Baer, a Sacramento boxer and one-time Heavyweight Champion of the World, frequented the hotel in the 1930s where he "showed off his latest beauty" in the Senator Hotel lobby. Arthur Samish, one of the most influential and powerful individual lobbyists in the history of California, maintained a lavish suite at the hotel during the 1930s and 1940s. Joseph Massaglia Jr., who owned the Senator Hotel in the 1950s, sold it to Hilton Hotels in May 1956 as partial payment for the New Yorker Hotel in New York City. Hilton resold the hotel in September 1956 to a syndicate headed by Lawrence A. Wien.

Martin Luther King Jr. stayed at the Senator Hotel. In the 1940s, a young Joan Didion auditioned in the hotel for a Pasadena Playhouse theater part at a casting call and Pulitzer Prize-winning dramatist and author William Saroyan frequented the hotel bar. In 1954, Washington Redskins coach Curly Lambeau was fired after arguing with team founder George Preston Marshall in the Senator Hotel lobby. In the late 1950s, Stan Kenton and his controversial jazz orchestra held concerts in the Empire Room of the Senator Hotel. Throughout the 1950s, 1960s and 1970s, politicians such as Governors Jerry Brown and Ronald Reagan and Presidents Richard Nixon and Jimmy Carter spent time in the hotel. President Gerald Ford spent the night at the Senator Hotel before the September 5, 1975 assassination attempt on him by Manson family disciple Squeaky Fromme.

In early 1979, retired Major League Baseball player Mickey Mantle received $2,000 to attend the National Association of Health Underwriters of Sacramento convention at the Senator Hotel. In May 1979, the Senator Hotel was listed on the National Register of Historic Places, in part due to its early 20th century adaptation of parts barrowed from Palazzo Farnese and other Italian Renaissance motifs. Two months later, in July, the hotel was closed down because of 79 fire-safety and building-code violations. The building then was shuttered with panels placed over windows. That left Sacramento as the only city in the 25 largest metropolitan regions in the United States without a major historic hotel. Sacramento developer Marvin "Buzz" Oates purchased the Senator Hotel in November 1979 for $2.5 million and spent $15 million over the next eight years renovating the building. Oates reopened the building an office building in 1983 under the name "Senator Hotel Office Building" to give lobbyists short-distance access to California's state politicians. Equitable Real Estate Investment Management purchased the Senator Hotel in October 1987 for $30 million. Due to the Great Recession, the Senator Hotel's business occupancy level dropped to 60% and the previous owners lost property ownership to the Florida-based mortgage holder in 2012. The hotel was listed for sale in October 2012.

== Other Sacramento historic hotels ==
- Citizen Hotel
- Hotel Sacramento (1909–1956), 10th and K
- Travelers' Hotel (1914–1982), 428 J Street
