= Ken Avery =

American football player (born 1944)

- Avery in 1968

No. 54, 51, 53
- Position: Linebacker

Personal information
- Born: May 23, 1944 (age 82); New York, New York, U.S.
- Listed height: 6 ft 0 in (1.83 m)
- Listed weight: 227 lb (103 kg)

Career information
- High school: South Dade (Miami, Florida)
- College: Southern Miss (1963-1966)
- NFL draft: 1966: 12th round, 179th overall pick
- AFL draft: 1966: Red Shirt 2nd round, 11th overall pick

Career history
- New York Giants (1967–1968); Cincinnati Bengals (1969-1974); Kansas City Chiefs (1975)

Career NFL/AFL statistics
- Fumble recoveries: 10
- Interceptions: 2
- Sacks: 7
- Stats at Pro Football Reference

Kenneth William Avery (born May 23, 1944) is an American former professional football player who was a linebacker for nine seasons in the National Football League (NFL). He played college football for the Southern Miss Golden Eagles. Avery played in the NFL for 123 games, starting 77 times.

== Biography ==
=== Early life ===
Avery attended South Dade High School in Miami, Florida, from which he graduated in 1962. He was a three-sport star during his high school years and was tapped as a Florida All-State fullback during his senior season.

=== College career ===
He played college football at the University of Southern Mississippi, where he was a linebacker from 1964 to 1966. After playing on the freshman team for the 1963 season, he won the starting job at center in 1964 as a sophomore while also doing some double-duty playing defense for the 6-3 Eagles.

In 1965, he made the switch to full-time starting linebacker and led the team to a #1 ranking in the nation in total defense. He also still played some center and was a long-snapper for the 7-2 Eagles, with four of the wins shutouts.

In 1966, his senior season, the Eagles again led the nation in total defense for the 6-4 Eagles.

After his senior season he was named to the all-star Senior Bowl and Blue-Gray Games.

=== Professional career ===
Avery was chosen as a "future" in the 12th round (179th overall) of the 1966 NFL draft by the National Football League's New York Giants and in the second round of the Red Shirt portion of the 1967 AFL draft by the American Football League's Boston Patriots.

He signed with the Giants and played linebacker for the Giants in the 1967 and 1968 seasons during which he played in all but one game.

In 1969, he went to the AFL's Cincinnati Bengals, for whom he played six seasons from 1969 to 1974 (the team entered the NFL beginning with the 1970 season). In his second year with the team, 1970, he became a starting linebacker, starting 13 of their 14 games and recording his first career interception.

He remained an effective starter in 1971, again starting 13 games, then starting 12 in 1972. In 1973, he played in all 14 games, starting four, and recorded his second career interception. By 1974 he was no longer a starter, but did see action in 13 games.

His ninth and final pro season was in 1975 with the Kansas City Chiefs, for whom he played all 14 games, starting five.

He finished his career with the Kansas City Chiefs in 1975.

In 1983, he was inducted into the University of Southern Mississippi M-Club Alumni Association Sports Hall of Fame.

=== Personal life ===
During his playing years, Avery listed his hobbies as water polo, skiing, sailing, and weightlifting.

After retiring from football, Ken Avery founded a valet parking and self-parking company, American Parking Consultants. That led to him, in 1982, founding and serving as President of Ambassador Limousine in North Miami Beach, Florida. He is also the former President of the National Limousine Association.

Ken Avery joined eGain Corporation as a Business Director for the Central Region within the United States in December or 2021.

== See also ==
- List of American Football League players
