= Berkeley Marine Corps Recruiting Center protests =

2007 anti-war protest in Berkeley, California

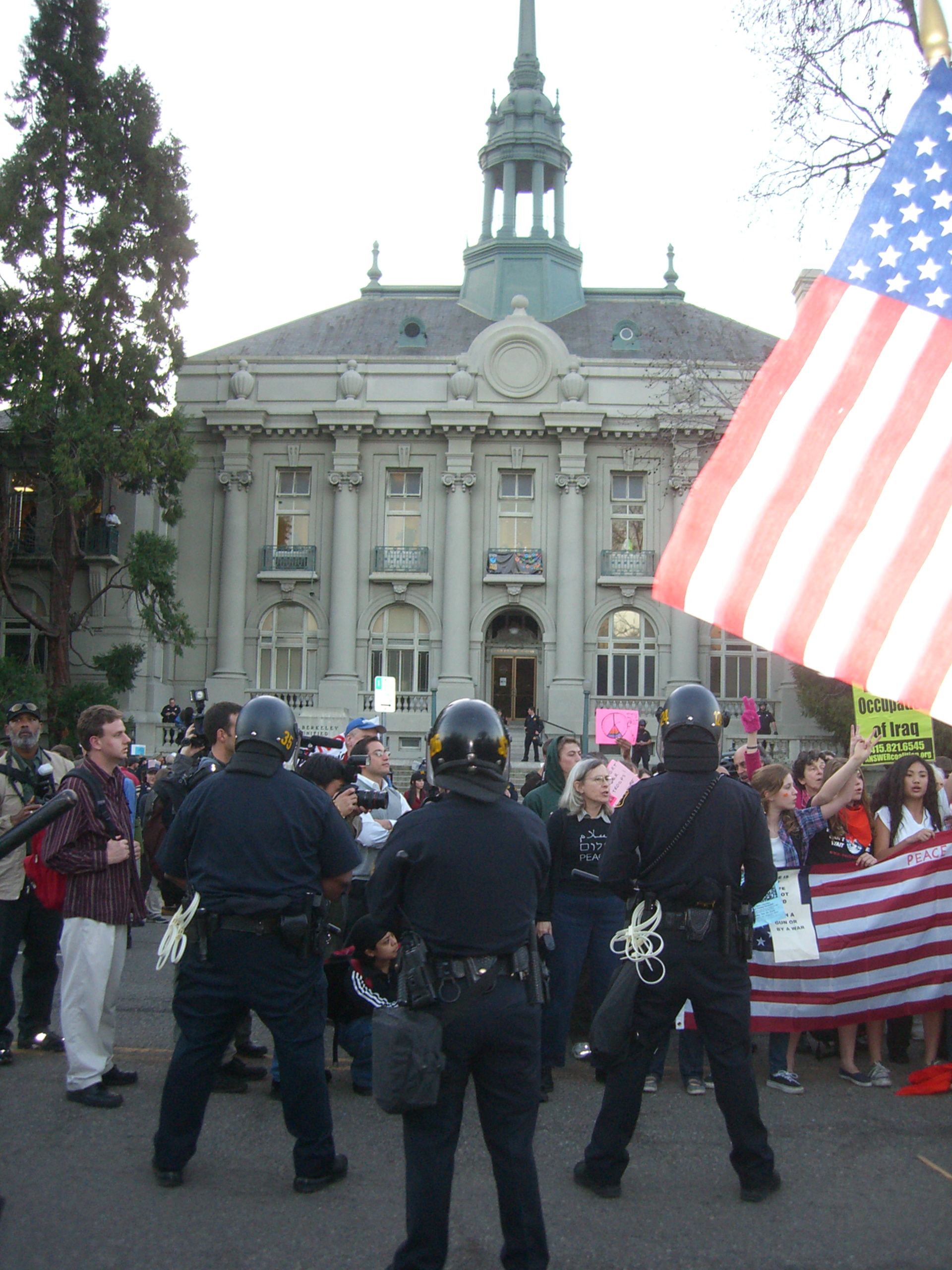
Code Pink demonstrators in front of Berkeley City Hall on February 12, 2008.

Beginning in September 2007, a small group of protesters from anti-war organization Code Pink began periodically protesting in front of a United States Marine Corps Officer Selection Office located in Downtown Berkeley, California at 64 Shattuck Avenue by standing in front of the office holding banners and placing signs. The recruiting center had been located in Berkeley since January 2007. On October 17, 2007, the group Move America Forward held a counter protest.

On January 29, 2008, the Berkeley City Council passed a series of motions concerning the recruiting center. The most controversial motions ordered the city clerk to draft a letter calling the Berkeley Marines "unwelcome intruders" and another motion gave Code Pink a parking permit on Wednesdays and a noise permit. The motions drew national media coverage. Some veterans groups and conservatives were angered by the motions. National and state laws were drafted to remove funding for Berkeley. The Berkeley City Council changed the wording in the letter February 13, 2008, to remove the most controversial wording and communicate support for the troops but opposition to the war. On the previous day, 2000 protesters at its peak gathered outside city hall to protest against and in support of the motion. The national media coverage of the matter significantly declined following Berkeley's amended language. Legislation backed by Republican members of Congress concerning removing earmarks continued through the legislative process, though with little chance of passing, and Move America Forward launched a new advertisement criticizing the Berkeley City Council. Code Pink continues to collect signatures to put a measure on the ballot to remove the recruiting center.

== History ==
Berkeley had a previous history of opposition to Marine recruiting. In 2007, Berkeley High School became the last in the United States to give student contact information to the military without student permission. The school's previous policy required students to give permission for their contact information to be given to the military.

In January 2007, the Marine Recruiting Center for the northern Bay Area relocated from Alameda to downtown Berkeley in order to be closer to the University of California, Berkeley. There were no protests until late September 2007 when protests outside the recruiting office began. Code Pink and Grandmothers Against the War were among the first groups to protest. Code Pink said it would protest the recruiting center every Wednesday.

On Wednesday, October 17, 2007, a protest between those opposing the recruitment center and those who supported it, led by conservative radio talk-show host Melanie Morgan, co-founder of Move America Forward, occurred outside the recruiting center. The protest included chants, singing, flag waving, and verbal shouting back and forth. Police separated the two groups for safety. Some nearby businesses have complained about the noise level. Some motorists have honked in approval adding to the noise level.

On January 29, 2008, Code Pink began collecting the 5,000 signatures necessary to qualify a city measure for the ballot that would require public hearings before military recruiting offices could open near schools. Former Marine Staff Sgt. Bill Hamilton, who was involved in several altercations with protestors, told the San Francisco Chronicle that the recruiting office was only for recruiting college not high school students.

On February 1, 2008, protesters from The World Can't Wait, chained themselves to the doorway of the recruiting office, blocking the entrance, and preventing people from moving in and out.

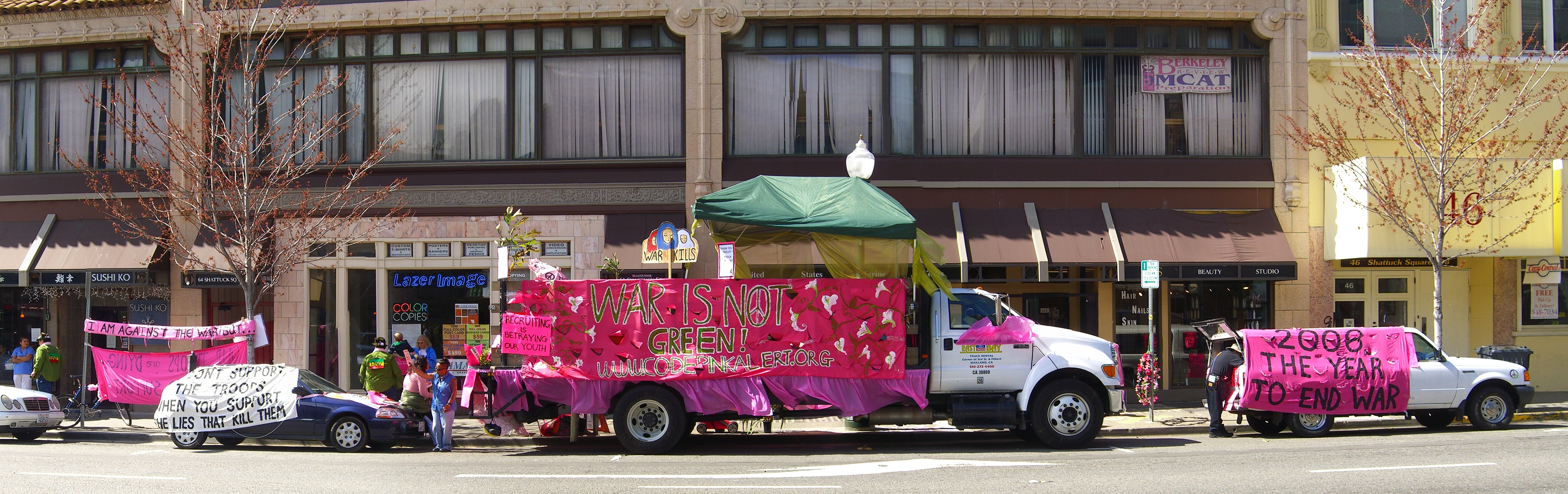
Code Pink protesters on March 14, 2008.

== City Council response ==
On January 29, 2008 the Berkeley City Council passed two motions regarding the controversy. The first motion, passed 8-1, gave anti-war protesters Code Pink a reserved parking space in front of the recruitment center and waived the normally required noise permits so they could operate their loud speaker. Gordon Wozniak of District 8 was the sole opponent of this motion. Since passing this motion, Code Pink has had an almost daily presence outside the recruiting office.

The Berkeley City Council 6-3, passed a motion to have the city clerk write a letter to the U.S. Marine Corps to inform them that they were "uninvited and unwelcome intruders" in the city of Berkeley. The motion stated that the United States had a history of "launching illegal, immoral and unprovoked wars of aggression" and that "military recruiters are salespeople known to lie to and seduce minors and young adults into contracting themselves into military service with false promises regarding jobs, job training, education and other benefits." This motion was opposed by councilmembers Betty Olds, Kriss Worthington and Gordon Wozniak, representing Districts 6, 7 and 8 respectively. The Berkeley City Council also asked the city attorney to investigate the possibility of fining the Marines for violating the city's ordinance requiring equal-opportunity hiring without regard to sexual orientation because of the military's don't ask, don't tell policy.

== Responses ==
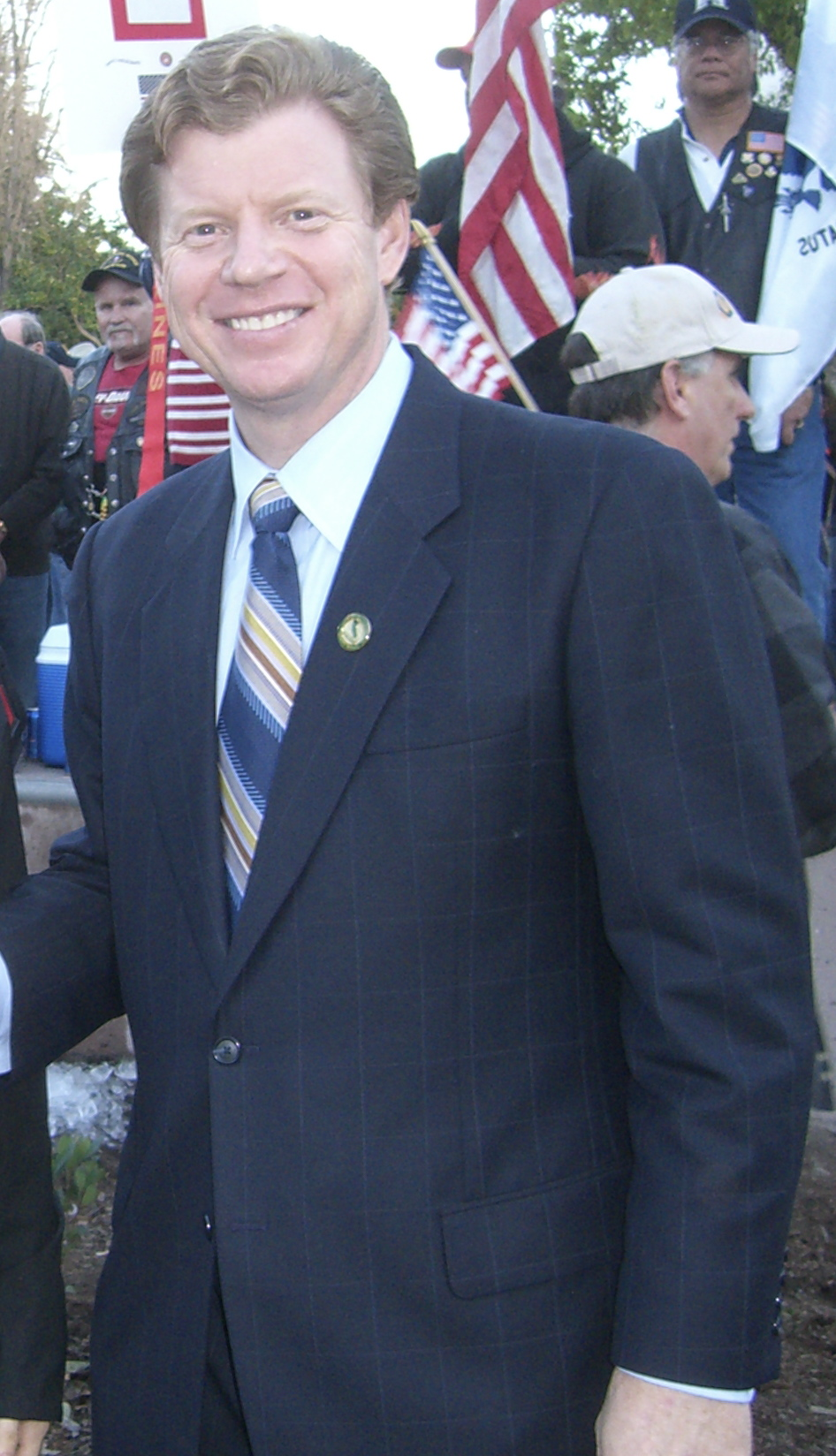
California Assembly member Guy Houston authored legislation to remove over $3 million in transit funding from Berkeley. He also appeared at the February 12 protest.

The position taken by the Berkeley City Council was interpreted by many across the country as a sign that they did not support the troops. Berkeley's motion was followed by a backlash in conservative blogs and among conservative lawmakers, including introduction of the "Semper Fi Act" in Congress to cancel several million dollars in specific federal funding for public primary and secondary education programs, the University of California, Berkeley, and key transportation programs including a proposed state-operated ferry service to Albany and Berkeley. In response to the council's vote, on February 1, 2008 Senator Jim DeMint said that he would introduce legislation that would strip Berkeley of its $2,392,000 in federal funding. On February 6, 2008 Jim DeMint was joined by Saxby Chambliss, Tom Coburn, John Cornyn, James Inhofe, and David Vitter in the Senate to introduce the Semper Fi Act of 2008 which would strip federal funding from Berkeley. In total, the bill was co-sponsored by 10 senators. The bill strips $243,000 from the Chez Panisse Foundation which provides school lunches to children in Berkeley, and $975,000 allocated to build the Matsui Center for Politics and Public Service at the University of California, Berkeley which would have created an archive of Robert Matsui's papers and a new endowment. The bill was defeated on March 13, 2008.

UC Berkeley Chancellor Robert Birgeneau sent a letter to 52 lawmakers in Washington stating that UC Berkeley had no connection to the council's decision, that the UC campus and the city of Berkeley are completely separate institutions, that the Berkeley City Council has no authority over the UC campus, that UC Berkeley has long standing ROTC programs, and that he believed the council proposals were "ill advised, intemperate and hurtful, particularly to the young men and women and their families who are sacrificing so much for our country." City Council member Gordon Wozniak criticized the act as unfair, stating "These people have nothing to do with the council's action. They should not be penalized just because they happen to live in Berkeley." Representative John Campbell sponsored a similar bill in the house that had 71 co-sponsors. The Berkeley Chamber of Commerce, which received 140 emails that stated they would no longer do business in Berkeley if the motions held, considered withholding business licensing taxes.

Republican Assemblyman Guy Houston of San Ramon announced that he will introduce legislation to withhold state transportation funds from Berkeley until they rescind their "war on the U.S. Marine Corps." Houston's proposed bill intends to withhold $3.3 million in state funds from Berkeley. Houston's bill failed to pass the California State Assembly Committee on Transportation by one vote.

== Council changes letter's language ==
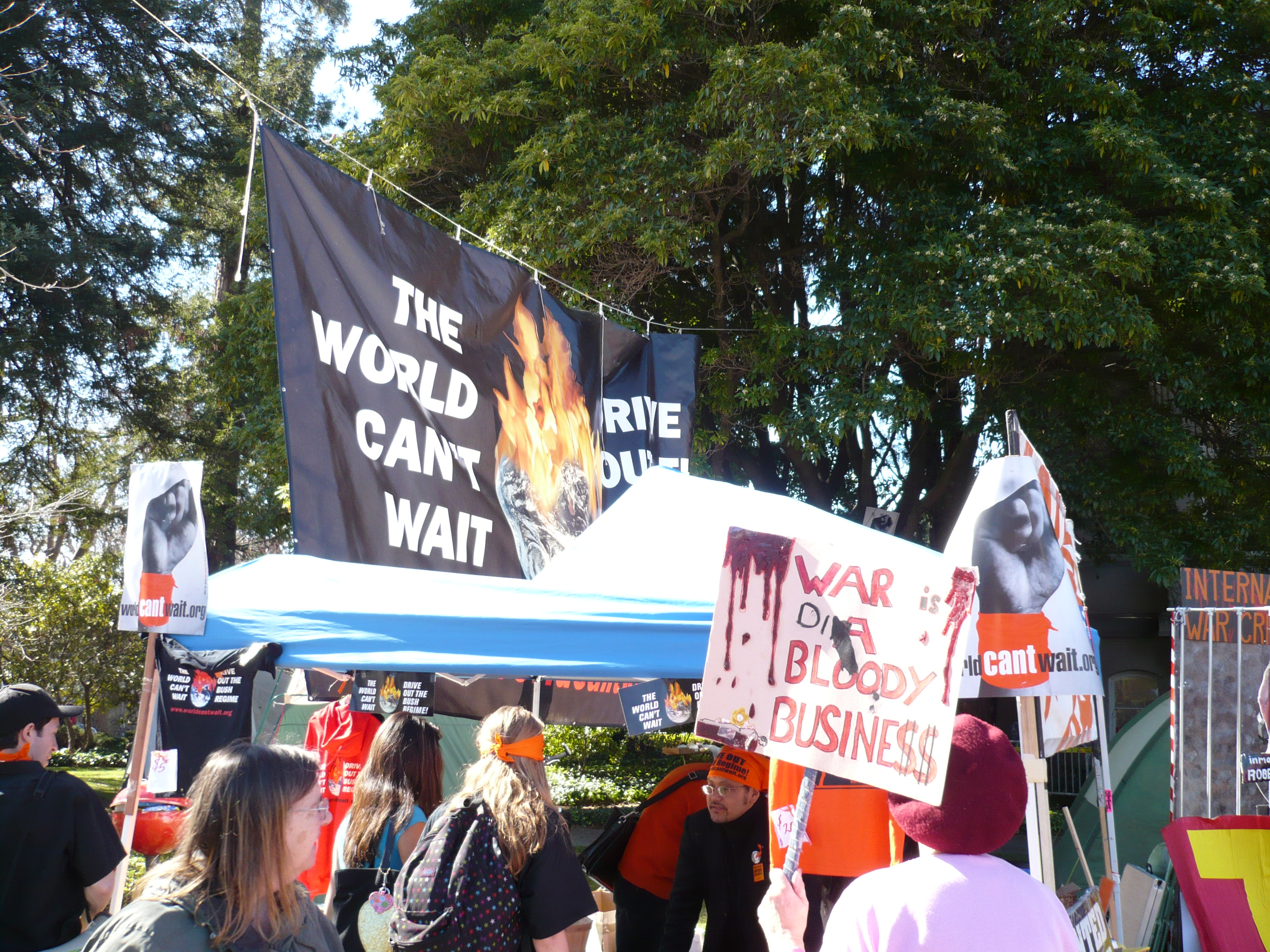
Code Pink at the February 12 protest.

25,000 people wrote to city leaders urging them to rescind the letter. Some members of the city council regretted their vote after the motion passed. Councilwoman Betty Olds said she was ashamed of her vote. On February 4, 2008, Council members Betty Olds and Laurie Capitelli called on the council to rescind the letter to the Marines and to declare that Berkeley was against the war but supported the troops. On February 12, 2008, the council met to reconsider the Marine Corps Recruiting motions. On this day, at its peak, 2,000 protesters gathered outside city hall, with one group protesting against the city council motion that included Move America Forward, and the other, consisting mainly of Code Pink, protesting in support of the motions. The two sides faced each other with police separating them on Martin Luther King Jr. Way; both sides exchanged songs, chants, flag waves, yells, and obscenities. The protest lasted 24 hours, ending at around 1:00 am on February 13. There were four arrests. The City of Berkeley spent $93,000 in police overtime on February 12 as part of a large police presence to keep the peace.

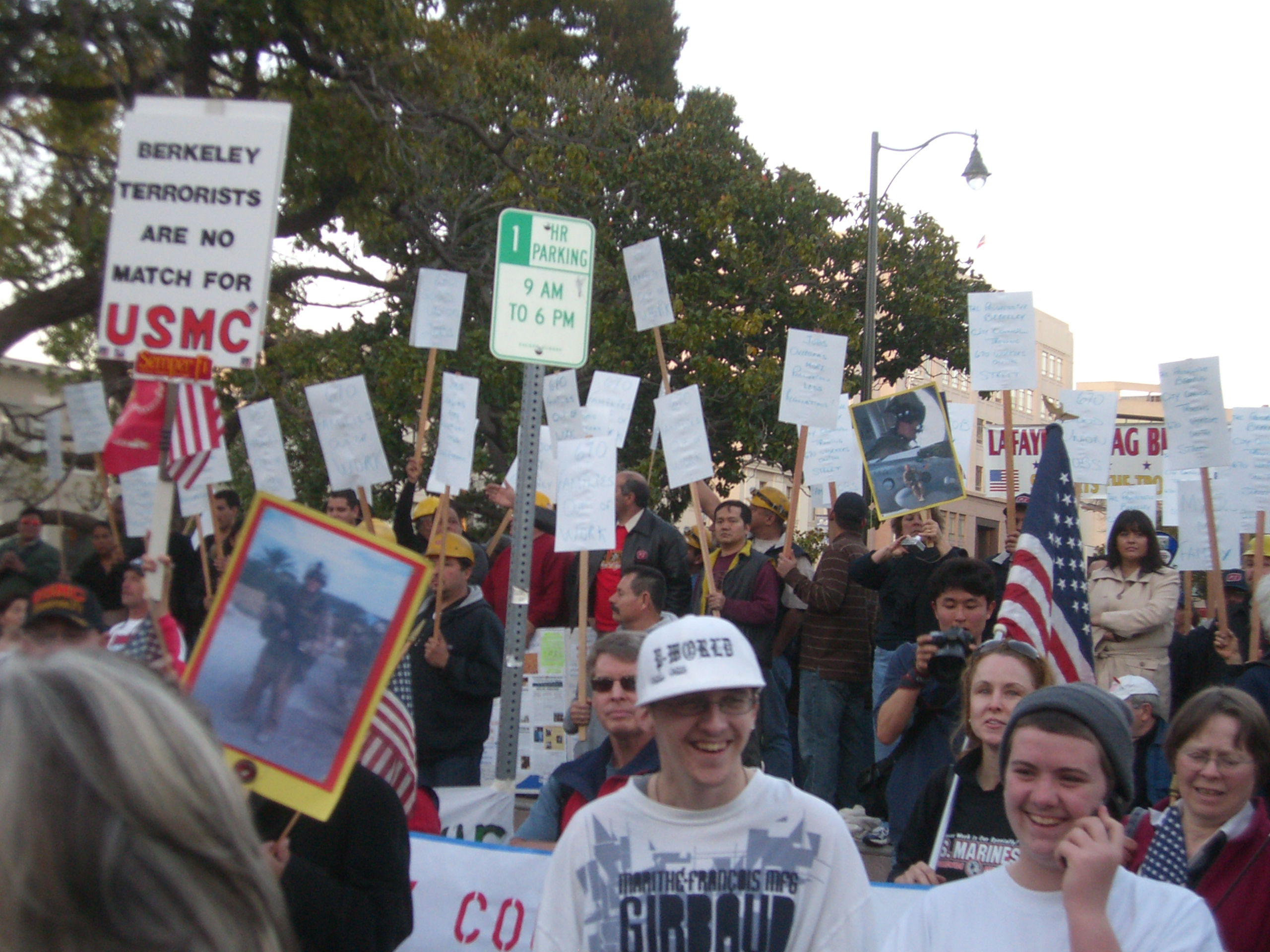
Protesters against the Berkeley City Council motions.

On February 13, 2008, after four hours of debates and public comment that included over one hundred speakers, ending at 1:30 am, the Berkeley city council decided 7-2 not to send the letter they had asked the city clerk to draft to the Marines. The new letter written by Mayor Tom Bates and Council members Max Anderson, Linda Maio and Darryl Moore affirmed "the recruiters' right to locate in our city and the right of others to protest or support their presence." The new letter also stated that Berkeley did not support "the recruitment of our young people into this war" but "deeply respect and support the men and women in our armed forces." The council decided 5-4 not to offer an official apology, but some individual members of the council expressed regret.

The council did not reverse four of its previous motions concerning the Marine Corps recruiting center. The council allowed to stand a resolution to "applaud residents and organizations such as Code Pink for "[impeding], passively or actively" military recruiting. The parking permit and noise permit for Code Pink was also upheld. Mayor Bates told the San Jose Mercury News: "The Marines have the right to be in Berkeley. It was bad judgment for them to come here. We wish they would leave. We support their right to be here but we wish they would move on."

== After council reversal ==
Federal and state legislation seeking to remove funding for Berkeley was not dropped and is currently still pending. Senator DeMint said after the council's actions: "It's a national embarrassment that these officials refuse to apologize to our troops and their families and continue to support actions against military recruitment." On the Senate floor, California US Senator Barbara Boxer argued against DeMint's amendment, and said that other state and local governments pass resolutions and measures that Congress doesn't agree with, without getting their funding for earmarks removed. Because of Democratic control of the legislatures and fear of voter backlash, it is unlikely that either measure will pass. The group supporting Marine recruiting, Move America Forward, sent 3 tons of candy, cookies, hot cocoa, coffee and beef jerky to troops serving in Iraq and Afghanistan. Code Pink continued its protests outside the recruiting center. Code Pink cofounder Medea Benjamin said of the council's decision: "We are really proud of the Berkeley City Council for not buckling under intense pressure from the pro-war 'swift-boaters."

On February 20, the Associated Students of the University of California at Berkeley passed a resolution against the Berkeley City Council's rhetoric and methods against the Marine Corps recruiting center. The resolution also urged the City Council to submit a letter of apology to U.S. servicemen and women. While mostly a symbolic measure, the resolution nonetheless shows the historically anti-war campus voices support for the troops and adds pressure from Berkeley residents.

In the aftermath of the controversy, City Councilmember Gordon Wozniak planned to present a proposal to the City Council in its February 26 meeting requiring that all recommendations/resolutions coming from the city's Peace and Justice Commission (PJC) be heard twice by the City Council before they are approved. The PJC, the author of the January 2008 resolutions, is the most prolific and controversial of the 45 bodies that makes recommendations to the city council. However, Councilmember Wozniak withdrew it from the agenda and referred it for rescheduling.

On February 23, 2008, a scuffle occurred between about 25 activists and police that resulted in 2 arrests and sprained fingers and bruises for police after The World Can't Wait activists violated the rules by chaining themselves together and marched with bullhorns.

== Move America Forward advertisement ==
On February 21, 2008, Move America Forward screened a television advertisement on the University of California, Berkeley campus that was critical of the Berkeley council. The sixty second advertisement shows council members and the mayor saying that they had no reason to apologize followed footage of two former Marines asking the viewers to sign an online petition to persuade the city council to apologize. The advertisement will run on Bay Area and Sacramento news programs as well as nationally on Fox News and CNN. In response to the advertisement Council member Max Anderson said that the council will not be bullied or coerced into action.

== Code Pink ends protests ==
On September 24, 2008, after nearly a year of regular protest, Code Pink announced that "Major protest operations at the (Marine Corps Recruiting Center) have been ended." Approximately one month later, the offices of the East Bay chapter of Code Pink closed down when the lease on the building that housed the organization expired and the group was unable to secure funds to renew the lease. However, anti-war protests organized by The World Can't Wait still continue at, and in the vicinity of, the Marine Corps Recruiting Center on Shattuck Avenue.

== See also ==
- Counter-recruitment
- Military recruitment
- Opposition to the Iraq War
