= Berkeley protests =

Berkeley protests may refer to:

- 1960s Berkeley protests, a series of events at the University of California, Berkeley, and Berkeley, California, U.S.
- Berkeley Marine Corps Recruiting Center protests, series of protest begun by Code Pink in 2007 in Berkeley, California, U.S.
- 2017 Berkeley protests, a series of protests and clashes between organized groups that occurred in the city of Berkeley, California, U.S.
