= Kim Taylor =

Kim Taylor may refer to:

- Kim Taylor (musician) (born 1973), American singer-songwriter
- Kimmie Taylor (born 1989), English fighter with the Kurdish Women's Protection Units (YPJ) and the first British woman to join a female militia in Syria
- Kim Taylor (Neighbours) (active 1985–2017), a character from the television show Neighbours
- Kim Taylor (educationalist) (1922–2013), British educationalist
- Magenta Devine (1957–2019), born Kim Taylor, British television presenter and journalist
- Kim Taylor (businesswoman) (born 1981/2), American CEO of Cluster, former founder of Ranku, was on reality television show Start-Ups: Silicon Valley
- Kim Taylor (politician) (born 1978), American politician
- Kim Taylor Reece, Hawaiian artist
