= Single-frequency =

Single-frequency may refer to:

- Single Frequency Approach, a service for a military single-piloted turbojet aircraft to use a single UHF frequency during their landing approach
- Single-frequency network, a broadcast network where several transmitters simultaneously send the same signal over the same frequency channel
- Single-frequency signaling, line signaling in which dial pulses or supervisory signals are conveyed by a single voice-frequency tone in each direction
- A single-frequency tone
