= Sarah Austin (entrepreneur) =

American internet personality and entrepreneur (born 1986)

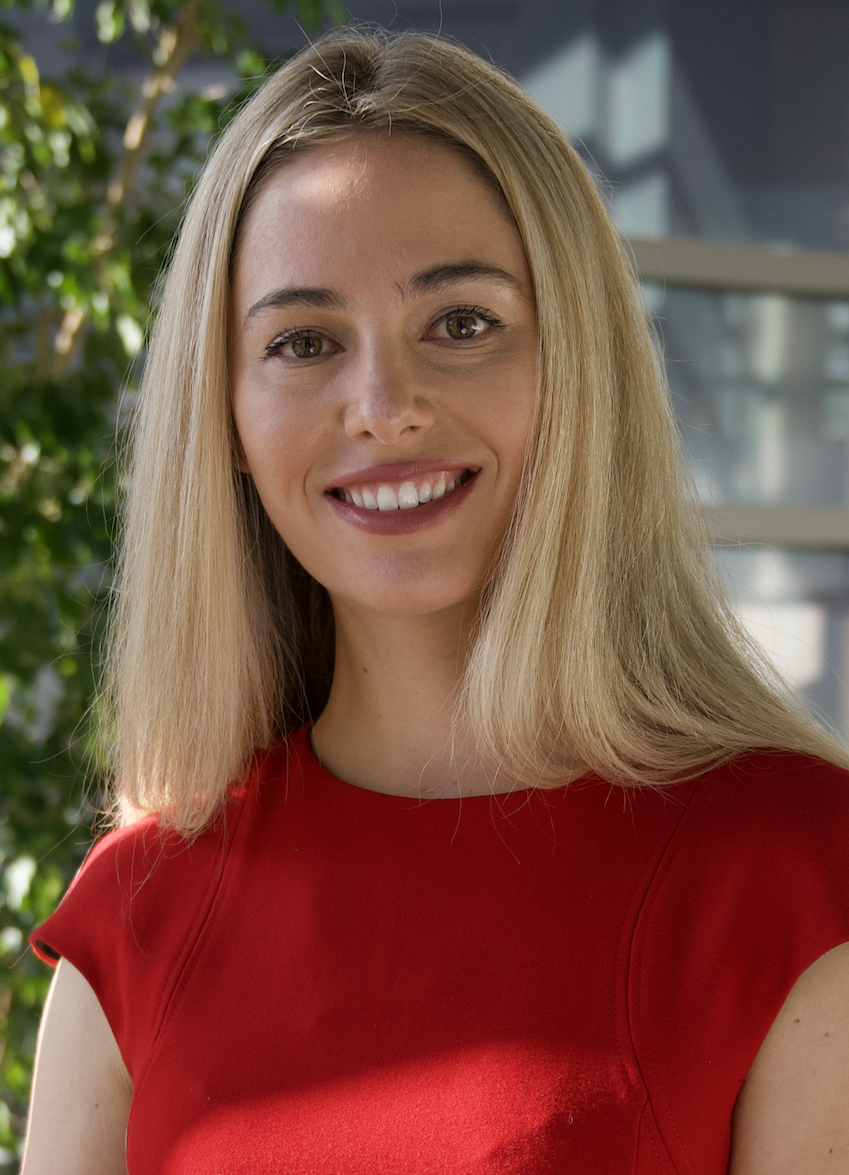
- Austin in 2021
- Born: Sarah Maria Austin; January 1986 (age 40); Rogers, Arkansas, U.S.
- Other name: Sarah Meyers
- Years active: 2006–present
- Known for: Lifecasting, video journalism
- Notable work: QGlobe, Broad Listening
- Website: www.sarahaustin.com

Sarah Maria Austin (b. January 1986) is an American author and tech entrepreneur. She is the CMO and co-founder of metaverse funding platform, QGlobe, and former CEO at Broad Listening, an artificial emotional intelligence agent. She is the chairperson of the board of directors at Coding FTW, a nonprofit organization that promotes diversity and equal rights in the technology sector.

== Early life and education ==
As a young child, Austin moved with parents from Rogers, Arkansas to Tiburon, California. In the ninth grade, Austin joined a leadership development and mentorship program called Summer Search. While in Summer Search, she studied New Media at Stanford University and also attended Mount Holyoke College in Massachusetts. In 2004, she graduated from Tamalpais High School in Mill Valley, California.

Upon returning to California, Austin attended film and broadcast classes at San Francisco State University, later relocating to Parsons The New School for Design in New York City. In 2010, she was a Dominican University of California business management student.

== Career ==
=== Entrepreneurship ===
Austin is the founder of Coding FTW, a non-profit organization that provides scholarships for women in computer programming and technology. Austin was the first marketing hire at Kava, a decentralized finance platform, serving as its CMO. She held roles in content marketing at SAP, Oracle, and Ford Motor including its campaigns around the Consumer Electronics Show and the US launch of the Ford Fiesta.

=== Media ===
Austin began her career as a tech-news producer and DJ for three years at UC Berkeley’s radio station, KALX. She moved into video with news segments for D7TV's Story Today and created her own D7TV series, Party Crashers, in which she filmed Silicon Valley parties.

During the spring of 2007, she was chosen as a participant in the closed beta test of Justin.tv and lifecasted for them.

==== Pop17 ====
Pop17
- Genre: Technology culture news
- Language: English

Cast and voices
- Hosted by: Sarah Austin

Technical specifications
- Picture format: HDTV

Publication
- Original release: April 1, 2008 – November 29, 2015
- Provider: mevio, YouTube, Justin.tv, Livestream

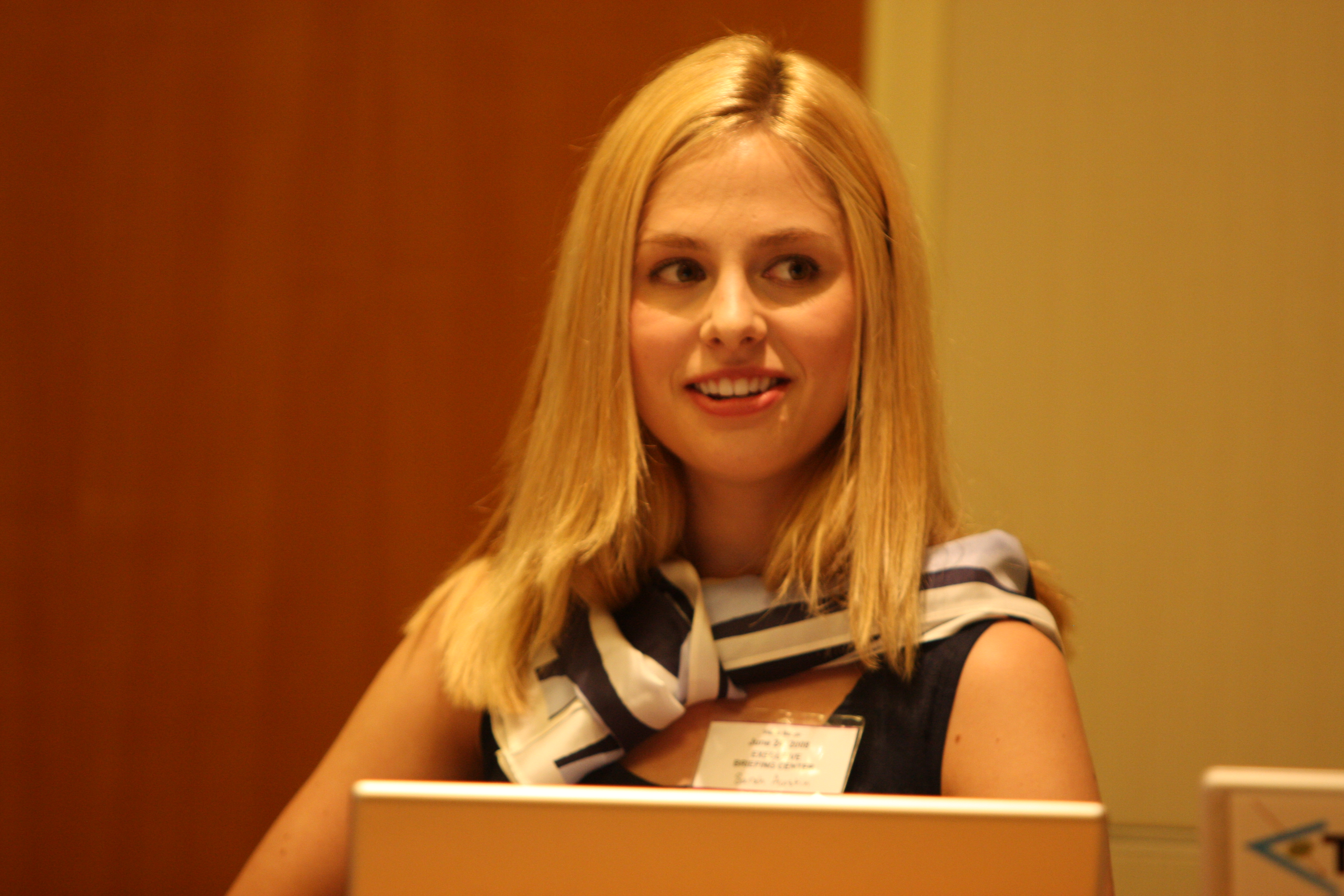
Austin at Intel's Social Media in June 2008

After extensive tests through the winter of 2007-08 under the name PopSnap, Austin launched a web series and blog called Pop17 in March 2008. Pop17 features interviews with tech-oriented business owners and Internet personalities at tech-related events and parties. It also includes commentary and news on technology and business topics; Rocketboom and Mekanism contributed to the production of the show in 2008 and 2010. Contributors to Pop17 include Jesse Draper and Caitlin Hill.

==== Start-Ups: Silicon Valley ====
Austin was featured as one of the main cast members on Start-Ups: Silicon Valley, a reality TV show that aired on Bravo, that followed the lives of six people who worked for startup companies in the San Francisco Bay Area. On the show, Austin lives at the Four Seasons Silicon Valley as entrepreneur in residence, producing marketing videos for them on Pop17.

==== Other media ====
In late 2011, Austin became a correspondent for TV networks such as Fox and Logo. She worked as an online personality for The X Factor and The X Factor Pepsi Live Preshow, as well as casting their unscripted home-viewing parties via Skype. She hosted and co-produced the San Francisco edition of VidBlogger Nation; a Comcast OnDemand TV network with each host sharing stories of people, places and events in their city. She also produces tech reports for Logo's NewNowNext. Austin has been a correspondent for Better, where she explained topics and trends regarding social media. Since late 2010, Austin contributes articles and Pop17 episodes to Forbes magazine.

== Recognition ==
At age 25, Austin was named to Forbes 30 under 30 in media. Ignite Social Media included her in their ranking of five women covering New Media on the Internet. In 2008, she was named one of the 50 most influential female bloggers by North X East. Also in 2008, she appeared on Donny Deutsch's The Big Idea.

In the first edition of Dan Schawbel's' book Me 2.0: Build a Powerful Brand to Achieve Career Success, Austin and Pop17 were profiled in a chapter of "success stories". She was featured on the front cover of the May 2009 issue of Personal Branding magazine. In 2010, she was selected as one of Vanity Fair's "America's Tweethearts".
