= Broadway Masters =

Broadway Masters is an online streaming network bringing Broadway Masterclasses to PC and mobile devices worldwide. The company and first season was created in 2016 by online producer Marcus Lovingood and Broadway performer and choreographer Paul McGill.

== The Program ==
The Broadway Masters program features major theatrical performers including Taye Diggs (RENT, Hedwig and the Angry Inch), Anthony Rapp (RENT, If/Then), Laura Osnes (Grease!, Cinderella), Jon Rua (Hamilton, In the Heights), Nick Adams (Priscilla..., Wicked), Lindsay Mendez (Wicked, Godspell), Kurt Froman (Movin' Out, BLACK SWAN, NYC Ballet), Courtney Reed (Aladdin, In the Heights), Charlotte D'Amboise(Chicago, A Chorus Line), and a final interview with series director McGill, the series provides insight into the journey of making it on Broadway. Each go into depth about their path in the business, lessons and hardships they faced along their journey, and advice they would give to aspiring theater actors.
