= Marcus Lovingood =

American businessman

Marcus Anthony Lovingood
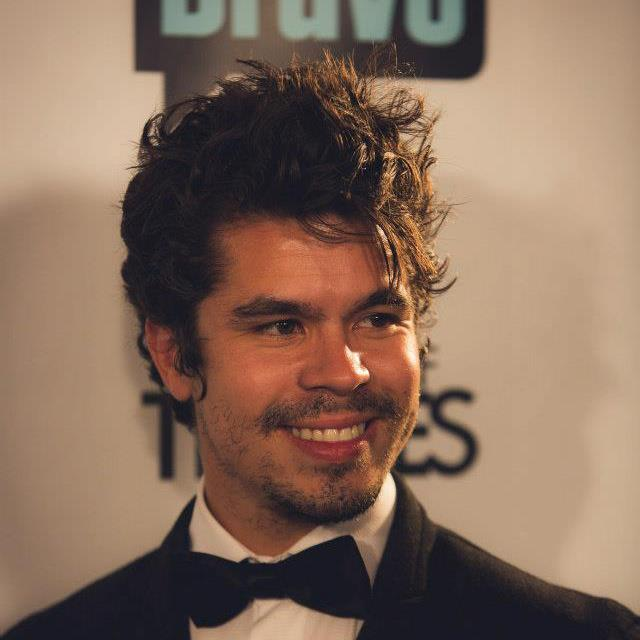
- Lovingood at the Start-Ups: Silicon Valley premiere in San Francisco
- Born: San Diego, California, U.S.

Marcus Anthony Lovingood is an American new media producer, political activist, internet entrepreneur, and former candidate for the Los Angeles City Council's 14th district. In 2012, Lovingood appeared on Bravo's Start-Ups: Silicon Valley. He is the founder of Pride PAC, the first LGBT-based super PAC.

== Start-Ups: Silicon Valley ==
In 2011, Lovingood was cast on the first season of Bravo's Start-Ups: Silicon Valley for his work as the founder and CEO of Futureleap Media. The show was marketed as one of the first reality shows with a "tech spin" where "Bravo will follow young Silicon Valley entrepreneurs as they break into the world's greatest startup hub." The show was executive produced by Randi Zuckerberg, sister to Facebook's Mark Zuckerberg. The show had only one season and was not renewed due to low viewership.

== Pride PAC ==
On February 13, 2012, Lovingood launched the Pride PAC in San Francisco, California with the aim to raise $1,000,000 to aid in President Barack Obama's re-election. The Pride PAC was billed as being "dedicated to raising money online, and to using social media and offline events to turn out the gay community across the country to re-elect Obama."

== Broadway Live ==
In 2013, Lovingood started Broadway Live, an online broadcast network bringing Broadway content to PC's and Mobile Devices. Early episodes featured Broadway performers such as Shoshana Bean and star of NBC's Smash Megan Hilty. On June 16, 2014 Broadway Live: Unplugged with Jonathan Reid Gealt premiered at Joe's Pub in New York City featuring X Factor's Rachel Potter, Mama Mia's Zak Resnick and The Voice's Loren Allred. The concert was broadcast on Monday, August 25, 2014.

== Broadway Masters ==
In 2016, Lovingood founded Broadway Masters with choreographer Paul McGill, an online streaming masterclass that assembles Broadway talent to share their journey from the studio to the stage in a digital educational program. The program features Taye Diggs (RENT, Hedwig and the Angry Inch), Anthony Rapp (RENT, If/Then), Laura Osnes (Grease!, Cinderella), Jon Rua (Hamilton, In the Heights), Nick Adams (Priscilla..., Wicked), Lindsay Mendez (Wicked, Godspell), Kurt Froman (Movin' Out, BLACK SWAN, NYC Ballet), Courtney Reed (Aladdin, In the Heights), Charlotte D'Amboise (Chicago, A Chorus Line), and a final interview with series director McGill, the series provides insight into the journey of making it on Broadway. Through the experience and real-stories of successful actors in the theater industry. Each go into depth about their path in the business, lessons and hardships they faced along their journey, and advice they would give to aspiring actors.

== Broadway West ==
In 2018, Lovingood founded Broadway West, a 501(c)3 nonprofit with a mission to activate Downtown Los Angeles's historic theater district.
