= Start-Ups: Silicon Valley =

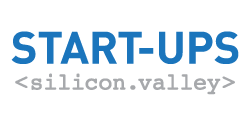
- Genre: Reality television
- Country of origin: United States
- Original language: English
- No. of seasons: 1
- No. of episodes: 8

Production
- Executive producers: Eric Detwiler; Evan Prager; Jesse Ignjatovic; Randi Zuckerberg
- Running time: 40 minutes
- Production companies: Den of Thieves; Zuckerberg Media

Original release
- Network: Bravo
- Release: November 5 – December 19, 2012

Start-Ups: Silicon Valley is an American reality television series that aired on Bravo. The series debuted on November 5, 2012. Citing low viewership, Bravo chose not to renew the series for a second season.

== Premise ==
The series followed six start up companies in the Silicon Valley.

== Cast ==
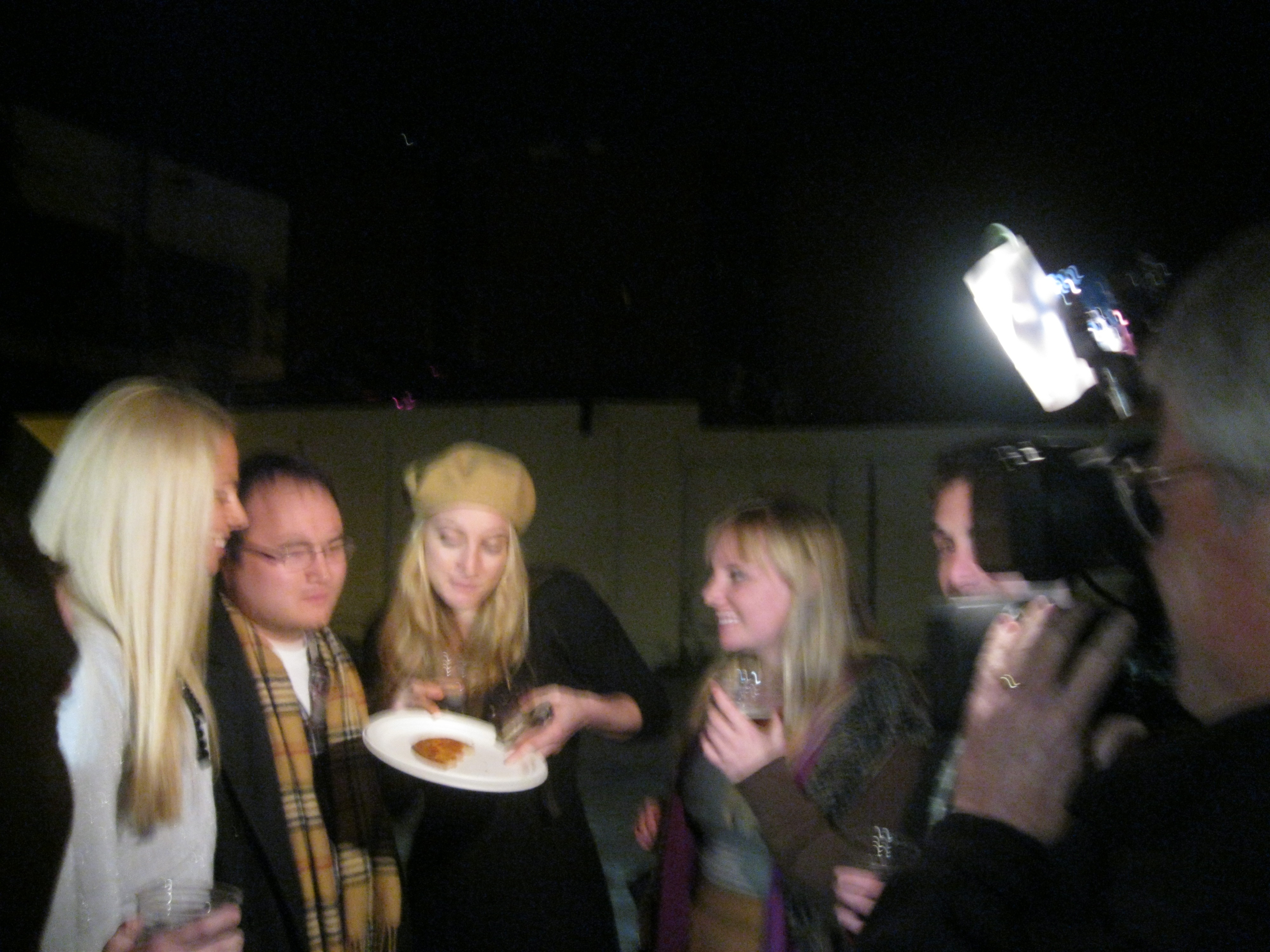
Hermione Way (center) and Sarah Austin (left)

- Ben Way
- David Murray
- Dwight Crow
- Hermione Way
- Kim Taylor
- Sarah Austin
- Marcus Lovingood
- Jay Holanda, model
- Michael Gale, investor

== Episodes ==
No.	Title	Original release date	U.S. viewers (millions)
1	"Starting Up"	November 5, 2012	0.634
2	"#Awkward"	November 12, 2012	0.584
3	"Connect/Disconnect"	November 19, 2012	0.604
4	"Restart"	November 26, 2012	0.512
5	"Breaking the Code"	December 3, 2012	N/A
6	"Last Pitch Effort"	December 11, 2012	N/A
7	"Face Time"	December 18, 2012	N/A
8	"Unfinished Business"	December 19, 2012	N/A
