= Dwight Crow =

Dwight Crow is an American technology entrepreneur. He co-founded the used-car search company Carsabi, whose founders were hired by Facebook in 2012, co-founded Whisper, a company that developed artificial intelligence-based hearing technology, and founded Additive, an AI tax-document company acquired by Thomson Reuters in 2025.

== Early life and education ==
Crow attended the University of California, Berkeley, where he studied chemical biology and computer science. While at Berkeley, he served as president of the university's computer science undergraduate association.

== Career ==
Crow founded Carsabi, an online service designed to aggregate used-car listings, with Christopher Berner. The company participated in Y Combinator's Winter 2012 batch. In October 2012, Facebook hired Carsabi's co-founders in an acqui-hire, bringing the founders on board without acquiring the company itself.

Crow was co-founder and chief executive of Whisper (also styled Whisper.ai), a San Francisco company developing an AI-based hearing-aid system that used a separate processing device to improve sound. The company released its Whisper Hearing System in 2020 and announced a $35 million funding round around the same time. In June 2023, Whisper announced a voluntary market withdrawal of the Whisper Hearing System and said it would issue refunds to purchasers as the company changed its business direction.

In 2023, Crow founded Additive (also referred to as Additive AI), a San Francisco startup that used generative artificial intelligence to automate the ingestion and processing of tax documents, with Aaron Taylor and Venky Iyer. In September 2025, Thomson Reuters announced that it had acquired Additive.

== Television ==
In 2012, Crow was featured on the Bravo reality television series Start-Ups: Silicon Valley, which followed a group of entrepreneurs in the San Francisco technology sector.

== 2015 Nepal earthquake ==
Crow was near Mount Everest when the April 2015 Nepal earthquake struck. According to TechCrunch, he had been hiking near Everest Base Camp when the earthquake triggered an avalanche that struck the camp. Crow survived and subsequently traveled through villages affected by the disaster while helping assess damage and raising more than $40,000 for emergency relief.

== Relief work in Ukraine ==
Crow volunteered a medical team in Ukraine during the 2022 invasion. He spent a month on the front in Kyiv helping evacuate trapped civilians and wounded soldiers from Irpin and Bucha.
