= Pride PAC =

Pride PAC is the first LGBT political action committee. Founded in February 2012, it supported Barack Obama's 2012 re-election campaign. It focused mainly on small donations raised online through its website and is dedicated to using the powers of social media to encourage voter registration and candidate advocacy in the fight for full equality.

== History ==
The Super PAC was founded in 2012 by internet entrepreneur and politico Marcus Lovingood and social media expert Rose Dawydiak-Rapagnani. As per Federal Election Commission rules established in the wake of the Citizens United Supreme Court decision, the group is legally prohibited from coordinating with the candidate or the candidate's campaign. The group was led by Lovingood, who succeeded in raising thousands of dollars in small contributions and amassing an online presence of 24,000 Facebook fans. Lovingood won an Instinct 'Leading Man' award for his work as the founder of the Pride PAC.

In 2014, the organization began to focus efforts on raising funds to help Bernie Sanders in his 2016 presidential campaign. After pressure to endorse Hillary Clinton in the primary from PAC members, the PAC launched an eight-city Pride tour after endorsing Hillary Clinton for President of the United States.

Michael Bracco, a past Walt Disney Parks and Resort executive, took control as president in January 2017 after the inauguration of Donald Trump to the presidency. The mission of the club was updated to dedicate funds and resources toward the defeat of Trump in the 2020 Presidential Election.
