= David Murray (water polo) =

British water polo player (1925–2020)

Personal information
- Nationality: British
- Born: 13 June 1925; Motherwell, Scotland
- Died: 20 October 2020 (aged 95)

Sport
- Sport: Water polo

David Young Murray (13 June 1925 – 20 October 2020) was a British water polo player. He competed at the 1948 Summer Olympics and the 1952 Summer Olympics.
