= Kim Taylor (businesswoman) =

American entrepreneur

- Born: 1981 or 1982 (age 43–44); Madison, Wisconsin, US
- Education: Arizona State University
- Occupation: Entrepreneur

Kim Taylor (born 1981 or 1982) is an American entrepreneur. She founded the online college manager company Ranku and the recruitment technology company Cluster, the latter of which she is serving as its CEO.

== Career ==
Taylor attended college at a Marquette University in Wisconsin, during which she spent a year as an NBA dancer with the Milwaukee Bucks which went to the East conference finals. She then transferred to Arizona State University to study journalism, during which she covered football games for The Arizona Republic. She graduated from Arizona State in 2005 with a Bachelor of Arts, and continued working with The Arizona Republic.

In 2008, she was working with an online publisher in Chicago but started having interests in online education. In 2012, she joined the cast of entrepreneurs in the reality television series Start-Ups: Silicon Valley where she worked as an account manager and head of sales for Ampush Media. During the series, she quit Ampush and created a startup business called Shonova which focused on the fashion industry. However, Shonova lasted a few weeks before she gave that up.

In June 2013, Taylor joined Kaplan EdTech Accelerator, a partnership between Kaplan, Inc. and Techstars which hosts, mentors, and funds startup companies in education technology and product innovation for a three-month program in New York City. As part of joining EdTech, she co-founded with childhood friend Cecilia Retelle the online degree company Ranku and served as the Chief Executive Officer. She named it after the Japanese rending of the phrase rank. The goal of the company was to enable non-profit universities that offer online degrees to compete with the larger for-profit online degree companies such as University of Phoenix. Mark Cuban was the lead investor in Ranku. Business Insider named Taylor one of “Silicon Alley Top 100 Coolest People In New York Tech” in 2013. In 2016, Ranku was acquired by John Wiley & Sons.

Taylor founded the company Cluster, which aims to help job seekers in the manufacturing industry.
