= Melanie Morgan (radio personality) =

American journalist

- Born: Kansas City, Missouri, U.S.
- Occupations: author, columnist, political commentator, radio show host
- Spouse: Jack Swanson
- Website: www.MelanieMorgan.com/

Melanie Morgan is an American radio personality, formerly with KSFO (560 kHz AM) in San Francisco, where her husband, Jack Swanson, was VP of News and Programming. She was laid off from KSFO due to budget cutbacks and declining ad revenue, returned to host the morning show, then once more left the station as of July 10, 2013. She has also previously worked as a reporter for KGO-TV in San Francisco. She is the Chairman of Move America Forward, a non-partisan, non-profit, charitable organization that supports the U.S. armed forces and their missions in the war on terrorism. She is known for her advocacy on behalf of the American military, defense of the war on terror and criticism of American liberals.

== Personal life ==
Morgan was born in Kansas City, Missouri. She attended the Lindenwood University.

Her addiction to gambling was the subject of the TV-movie High Stakes: The Melanie Morgan Story. In 2006, she told the San Francisco Chronicle that she had not placed a bet in 13 years, and has served as president of the California Council on Problem Gambling.

Morgan is married to Jack Swanson, Director of News and Programming at KCBS Newsradio in San Francisco. They live in Novato, California.

Morgan serves on the boards of a number of other nonprofit organizations, including the Bruin Alumni Association.

On February 15, 2010 she revealed she had been diagnosed with thyroid cancer but the cancer has not spread.

== Professional career ==
Morgan began her career reporting on the 1983 Beirut Marine Barracks Bombing, Lebanon, where 241 Marines lost their lives. While she focuses on San Francisco Bay Area regional issues, she has covered events in China, Mexico and Iraq.

In 2006, Morgan's report on U.S. soldiers serving in Iraq: "Voices of Soldiers" earned was recognized by the Associated Press Mark Twain Awards for Best Special Program.

In October 2006, Morgan and reporter Catherine Moy published American Mourning, which reported on two families whose sons, best friends from Army training and who died two weeks apart in Iraq, dealt with their sorrow. Anti-war activist Cindy Sheehan became angry and hung an American soldier in effigy outside of Sacramento. The book contains allegations from Sheehan's sister-in-law that Sheehan engaged in sexual misbehavior, and contrasts her behavior with the family of Justin Johnson, whose father enlisted as a private in the military at age 46 following his sons death. Both families remain traumatized.

Melanie Morgan co-hosted a highly rated morning show with Lee Rodgers and traffic reporter "Officer Vic" on San Francisco Bay Area radio station KSFO. Her tenure on the KSFO morning show ended in March 2008 when the station "decided not to renew her contract as part of the company’s announced across-the-board financial cost cutting".

Talk Radio Network tapped Morgan to be the host of the network's new morning show, America's Morning News. It debuted June 15, 2009, co-hosted by John McCaslin and managed by the Washington Times, who contributes reporters to the program. Morgan left the show January 5, 2010, citing health issues.

Morgan was added back to the KSFO morning show in January 2012, but has since left again, as of July 10, 2013.

== Political activism ==
Morgan and Michelle Malkin organized a pro-troop "webathon" on June 26, 2008. Conservative talk-show talent Rush Limbaugh, Sean Hannity, and Mark Levin participated. MAF members raised an aggregate of $1.055 million in gifts for U.S. soldiers and Iraqi children.

She is currently Chair of Move America Forward (MAF), a nonprofit, political advocacy group providing gifts to U.S. soldiers in Iraq. She was honored by Move America Forward (MAF) members on May 10, 2008. Morgan stated in the USA Today "I don't like third parties" and has been working with the Tea Party movement in California.

Move America Forward distributing Christmas cards to redeploying troops in Kuwait, December, 2007

As the chairman of Move America Forward, Morgan lead a 40-city campaign Heroes for the Holidays Tour to "rally support for the troops and their mission." During her last trip to the Middle East, Melanie Morgan and one of the Gold Star Mothers, Debbie Lee, brought over 100,000 Christmas cards to troops throughout the area of operations. Morgan will co-host Troopathon 2013.

== Controversial statements and criticism ==
After The New York Times published a story regarding U.S. government tracking of terrorist funding, Morgan said that editor Bill Keller should be tried for treason and "If he were to be tried and convicted of treason, yes, I would have no problem with him being sent to the gas chamber."

Melanie Morgan's comments about House Speaker Nancy Pelosi on the November 14, 2006 broadcast of the Lee Rodgers & Melanie Morgan Program have drawn criticism from media watchdogs and liberal bloggers. Morgan commented "We've got a bull's-eye painted on her big, wide laughing eyes." Morgan said the statement was a political metaphor that had been distorted by critics in order to appear violent.

In 2007, Morgan claimed during a broadcast on KSFO that Hungarian financier George Soros worked with the Nazis "in order to further his own career;" Soros was age 13 when the Nazis entered Hungary. During the broadcast, the station manager came on-air to deny the accuracy of the statements and to say KFSO "regrets that they were broadcast." This incident and others led to Morgan twice being named "Worst Radio Host in America" by MSNBC talk show host Keith Olbermann.

Morgan has also claimed that President Barack Obama attended a madrassa, an allegation that has been discredited.

=== The News Hour with Jim Lehrer ===
On May 9, 2007, Morgan appeared with VoteVets.org co-founder and chairman Jon Soltz on The News Hour with Jim Lehrer. Morgan accused the veteran of "political games" and undermining the U.S. troops serving in Iraq. Executive Producer Linda Winslow responded to complaints by saying,

Since neither guest was in the studio with Judy Woodruff, there wasn't much she could do to prevent them from interrupting one another, short of saying – as she did at least three times – 'please let him/her finish his/her point'. The NewsHour style is to ask pointed questions politely; we expect our guests to subscribe to the same rules. Since the program is produced live, we can't do much to eliminate rude guests from your television screen once the segment has begun; what we can do is guarantee you will never see Morgan on our program again.

Morgan subsequently blamed Media Matters for America for her persona non grata status, accusing the organization of "a bottom-line effort... [where] they call their people and ask them to call PBS."
