= Human Action (political action committee) =

Human Action is a political action committee (a super-PAC specifically) set up to raise money for candidates that support an Austrian School economic philosophy. It filed papers with the Federal Election Commission in December 2012, and supports the campaigns of Senator Rand Paul and the judge and former Fox News Channel host Andrew Napolitano.

Anthony Astolfi, the organisation's co-founder, has said they intend to support a campaign for Senator Paul to run for president. Astolfi has previously worked on the presidential campaign for Ron Paul in 2008, as well as the Senate campaign of Todd Akin and House campaign of Markwayne Mullin in 2012.

The name is a reference to the book Human Action: A Treatise on Economics by the Austrian School economist Ludwig von Mises.
