= David Isaac Murray =

Entrepreneur, computer scientist, and product designer

David Murray
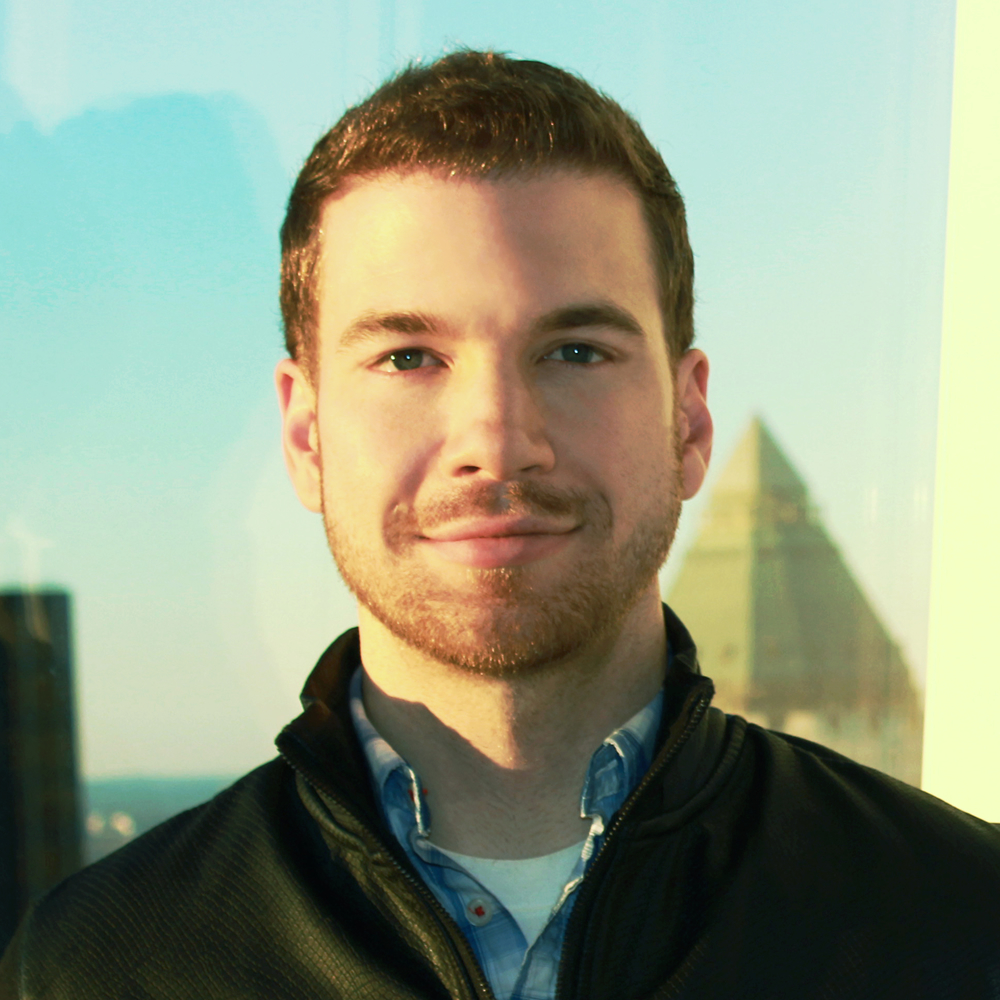
- Born: David Isaac Murray; 27 August 1983 (age 42); Albuquerque, New Mexico, United States
- Occupations: Entrepreneur, computer scientist, product designer

David Isaac Murray (born 27 August 1983) is an entrepreneur, computer scientist, and product designer best known for his appearance as one of the main cast members on Start-Ups: Silicon Valley. Originally a product manager at Google from 2006 to 2008, he received the Google Founders Award and EMG Award for his work on Gmail. After Google, Murray held several senior positions at startup companies in Silicon Valley, California. He started his company, GoalSponsors, in 2012 and eventually sold it to Doctor.com in 2014. He served as Chief Technology Officer of Doctor.com until 2019. Murray co-founded Confirm in 2019 with Josh Merrill; Confirm was acquired by Learning Pool in 2026.

== Early life ==
Murray grew up in Albuquerque, New Mexico. He attended the Albuquerque Academy from grades 6 to 12. He attended Carnegie Mellon University as a triple major in Computer Science, Human-Computer Interaction, and Voice Performance, where he graduated in 2006, Phi Beta Kappa, as recipient of the CMU Alumni Award for Research Excellence in Computer Science.

== Business history ==
Murray was Associate Product Manager for Gmail at Google from 2006 to 2008. He later served as Senior VP, Product Management at Inform Technologies in 2008, User Experience Lead at Cryptic Studios from 2008 to 2010, and Director of Product for Raptr from 2010 to 2012 before founding GoalSponsors, which later became known as ReferBright, a marketing automation platform for healthcare practitioners. ReferBright was sold to Doctor.com in 2014. He served as Chief Technology Officer at Doctor.com, which was acquired by Press Ganey in 2020.

Murray co-founded Confirm in 2019 with Josh Merrill. Learning Pool acquired the company in May 2026. In August 2026, Learning Pool rebranded as Confirm and renamed the acquired performance-management product Perform.

== Television, film, and media ==
In 2012, Murray appeared as one of the main cast on Bravo's TV Show Start-Ups: Silicon Valley working on an accountability buddies mobile app called GoalSponsors. He has authored articles in publications including Fast Company and has been a contributing author to Forbes through his membership with the Forbes Technology Council. His writing focuses on the intersection of business, technology, and the human experience.

== Awards ==
- 2013 Named "One to Watch" by BRINK Magazine
- 2008 Google Founders Award, EMG Award
- 2006 Carnegie Mellon SCS Alumni Award for Research Excellence in Computer Science
- 2006 Andrew Carnegie Society Scholar, Mortar Board Senior Honor Society
- 2005 Phi Beta Kappa
- 2001 Cum Laude National Honor Society

== Board and Council Memberships ==
- Member, Forbes Technology Council (2018–present)
- Board member, Carnegie Mellon University Alumni Association Board (2017–present)
- Board member, Carnegie Mellon University School of Computer Science Alumni Advisory Board (2005–present)
- President, Rainbow Recreation (2015–present)
- Board member, South Bay Volleyball Club (2013–present)
