= Arthur Samish =

American lobbyist (1897–1974)

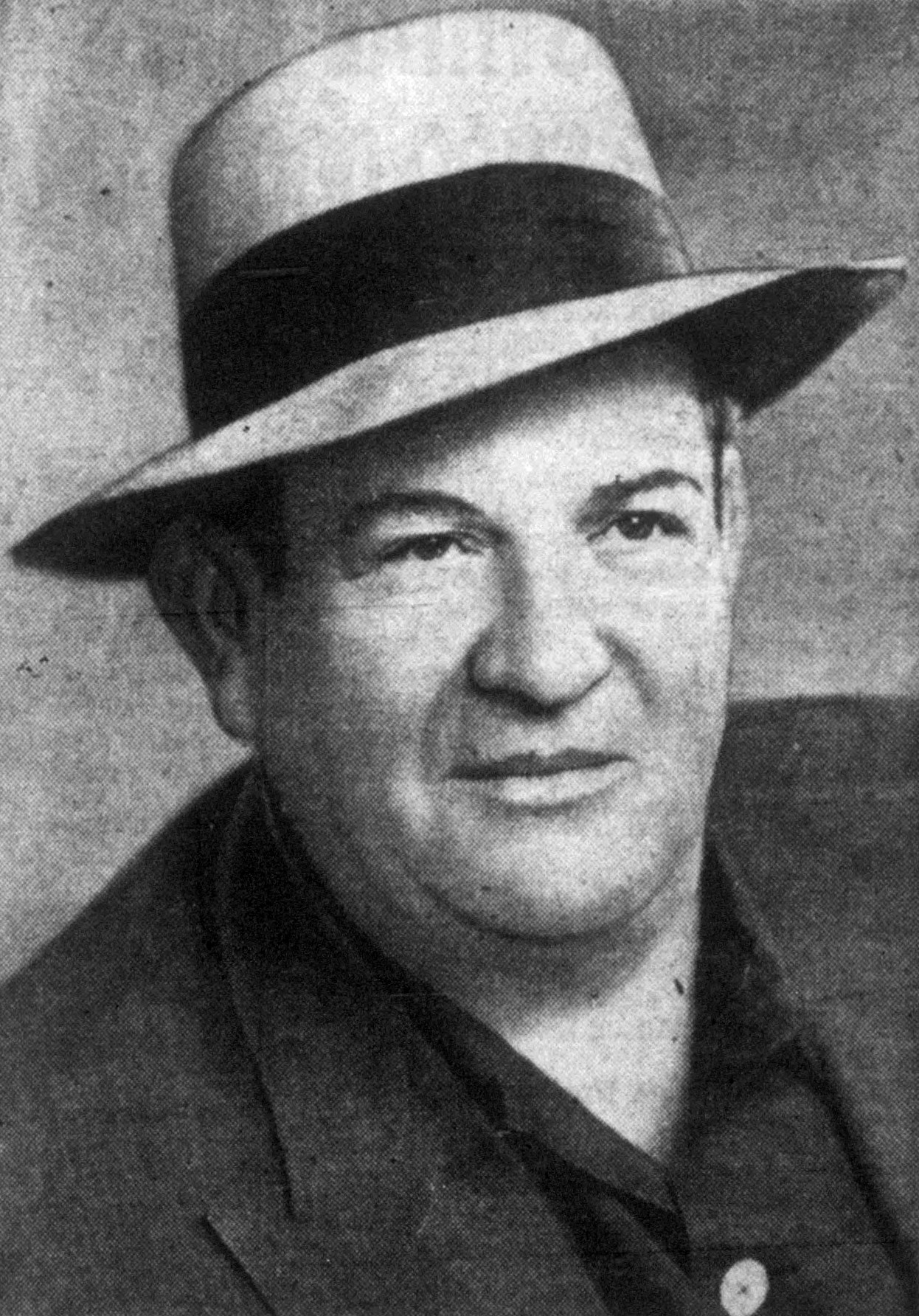
Samish, circa 1953

Arthur H. Samish (August 9, 1897 – February 12, 1974) was a California lobbyist, representing movie studios, racetracks, lawyers, insurance companies, fishing, cigarette, liquor and brewing interests. Politically powerful throughout his career, he was convicted of tax evasion in 1953, which led to a three-year stint in prison beginning in 1956 as well as millions of dollars in penalties. He retired from politics in 1959 and died in San Francisco in 1974.

In an article published on August 13 and August 20, 1949, Samish poses in the national "Collier's Magazine" with a Charlie McCarthy-type dummy. Samish said to the dummy, "This is my legislature. How are you Mr. Legislature?" Members of the State Legislature were not amused, and the public was outraged.

== Bibliography ==
- H.R.Philbrick, Report on an investigation of reports of corruption in the Legislature of California (Premier Publications, Sacramento, 1949, reprinted from the original appearance in the California Senate Journal of 1939)*
- Lester Velie, “The Secret Boss of California,” Collier's, August 13, 1949. (The article that first "exposed" Samish nationally, though his power in Sacramento, ten years after the Philbrick Report, was already an open secret.)
- Samish, Arthur H.; Thomas, Bob (1971). The Secret Boss of California: The Life and High Times of Art Samish. New York: Crown Publishers.
- Arthur H. Samish and Bob Thomas, The Secret Boss of California; the Life and high times of Art Samish (NY, 1971)
- Thayer Watkins, Arthur Samish: A Political Boss of California
- History of the Political Reform Division, California Secretary of State
