= Youth Political Awareness PAC =

PAC focused on pre-high school education

Youth Political Awareness PAC is a nonpartisan Political Action Committee or 527 organization founded and operated by a staff of teenagers in San Diego, California. Youth Political Awareness PAC was established as a non-connected PAC by the Federal Election Commission in September 2014. Youth Political Awareness PAC is an ideological PAC that supplements kindergarten-8th grade civic education.

== Leadership ==
Chairman Justin Donovan and Chief of Staff Sam Haber are the Co-founders of Youth Political Awareness PAC, along with a governing board of directors who manage distinct departments in the organization.

== Education ==
Education is the largest department in the Youth Political Awareness PAC and is led by the director Christa Hoffman. The Youth Political Awareness PAC's education department visits and guides local civics classrooms through supplemental classroom simulations. The PAC, within its first two months, has been able to reach over 200+ students each month.

=== Official supporters ===
Youth Political Awareness PAC has received official support from local politicians and educators including:

- Former Vice President Joe Biden
- Kevin Faulconer, San Diego Mayor
- Scott Peters, congressional representative for San Diego (CS-52)
- Carol Kim, former educator, San Diego city council candidate (district 6)

The Youth Political Awareness PAC disclosed that its supporters do not reflect the political affiliation of the PAC.

== Links ==
- Krai. "YOUTH SUPER PAC PROMOTES INVOLVEMENT". www.92127magazine.com. 92127 Magazine. Archived from the original on 19 December 2014.
- Himchak. "Teens are teaching kids about politics, government". www.pomeradonews.com. Pomerado News.
- Walker, Mark (August 12, 2014). "Teenage PAC". MLIM. San Diego Union Tribune.
