= Single frequency approach =

In aviation, a single frequency approach (SFA) is a service for a military single-piloted turbojet aircraft to use a single UHF frequency during their landing approach. Circumstances permitting, pilots will not be required to change their frequency when they switch from ARTCC to terminal facility control when conducting an SFA.

In the U.S., per the FAA, controllers are not allowed to require a frequency change from aircraft conducting an SFA unless:

- Pilot has completed landing or low approach
- Aircraft is in VFR conditions during daylight hours
- Pilot requests a frequency change
- Emergency situation exists
- Aircraft is cleared for a visual approach
- Pilot cancels their IFR flight plan

If a change of control is necessary, controllers will hand off the frequency to each other, instead of having the pilots change the frequency on their radio.
