= National Limousine Association =

The National Limousine Association (NLA) is a voluntary, non-profit, tax-exempt organization founded in 1985, dedicated to representing and furthering the worldwide, national, state and local interests of the luxury chauffeured ground transportation industry. NLA's members include limousine owners and operators, suppliers, manufacturers, and regional and state limousine associations.

Kyle Hammerschmidt, CAE is the association's executive director since May 2019. The NLA is an official partner of UNICEF USA.

== Ride Responsibly ==
Ride Responsibly is an initiative started in February 2015 by the NLA to inform the public in an effort to ensure safer ground transportation. The campaign aims to bridge an industry-wide gap between the rights of passengers and the responsibility of service providers. The campaign establishes best safety practices for prearranged car services and transportation network companies (TNCs), which include ride-hailing app car services.

== History ==
- 1985: The National Limousine Association is incorporated on March 15.
- 1987: NLA hires Wayne Smith & Company as its first management company.
- 1989: NLA and LCT Magazine agree to co-manage an industry trade show.
- 1991: NLA and LCT sign first formal written agreement to co-manage trade show and share profits.
- 1997: The "NLA Charity Fund" changes to the "Harold Berkman Memorial Fund" after a vote from the NLA Board.
- 1998: Wayne Smith and Company is sold to Host Communications who assumes management role of the NLA.
- 2001: Bobit Business Media is hired as the management company of the NLA. At this time, the NLA has 500 members and $70,000 in assets.
- 2011: The NLA reaches over 2,000 members and $1,000,000 in assets.
- 2014: The NLA Board unanimously approves the hiring of EVINS Communications, the NLA's public relations firm.

== Board of Directors ==
Name	Position
Gary Buffo	President
Douglas Schwartz	First Vice President
Joe Ironi	Second Vice President
Robert Alexander	Treasurer
Brett Barenholtz	Secretary
Laura Canady	Bylaws Committee Co-Chair
Javaid Chaudhry	
Diane Forgy	Bylaws Committee Co-Chair Membership Committee Co-Chair
Jeff Greene	Congress of Association Leaders Co-Chair Nominating Committee Co-Chair
Kevin Illingworth	Scholarship Committee Co-Chair
Jason Kaplan	Public Relations Committee Co-Chair Sponsorship Committee Co-Chair
Donald Mahnke	Nominating Committee Co-Chair Political Action Committee Co-Chair
Michael Oldenburg	International Committee Co-Chair
Tracy Raimer	Show Education Committee Co-Chair Women's Leadership Council Co-Chair
Erich Reindl	Scholarship Committee Co-Chair
Rick Versace	Public Relations Comnmittee Co-Chair
Mark Leddy	Vendor Director

== Committees ==
Committee	Mission	Co-Chair	Co-Chair
Association Liaison	Provide support to local groups to strengthen their own memberships; serve as conduit between associations	Jeff Greene	Andy Thompson
Bylaw	Ensure NLA rules are followed; recommend changes as needed; oversee bylaw amendment process	Kevin Illingworth	Richard Kane
Charity Fundraising	Raise funds for NLA philanthropic arm Harold Berkman Memorial Fund	Robert Alexander	Ron Stein
Finance	Ensure sound financial standing and long-term stability of NLA	Robert Alexander	
International	Identify and address issues and concerns of non-U.S. members	Joe Ironi	Michael Oldenburg
Legislative	Foster proactive government relations program; protect members from harmful regulation and legislation; guide lobbyist(s) engaged to represent NLA interests	Richard Kane	Scott Solombrino
Management Oversight	Monitor performance of NLA’s management company; negotiate new agreements with management company and other service providers	Joe Ironi	Dawson Rutter
Membership	Increase NLA membership overall; maximize value of NLA membership	Laura Canady	Ron Stein
Nominating	Recruit qualified candidates to serve on NLA Board of Directors; oversee NLA annual election of board members	Stephen Qua	Erich Reindl
Political Action	Raise funds from membership to support NLA legislative and regulatory goals in the U.S.	Christopher Quinn	Dawson Rutter
Public Relations		Robert Alexander	Scott Solombrino
Scholarship	Implement program for new operators to attend International LCT Show	Kevin Illingworth	Andy Thompson
Show	Guarantee International LCT Show and other NLA-sponsored programs are highly valuable for attendees	Diane Forgy	Douglas Schwartz
Sponsorship	Cultivate and secure sponsor relationships; ensure highest value return to sponsors and NLA	Laura Canady	Erich Reindl
Technology & Social Media	Stimulate full use of available technology and social media to recruit, retain and inform NLA members	Michael Campbell	Stephen Qua

== Membership ==
Members of the National Limousine Association include companies and organizations operating in the limousine rental and transport industry. The association currently has a membership base of over 2,000 organizations, which encompasses a diverse range of companies such as EmpireCLS, BlackLimousines, Dav El/BostonCoach, Carey International, Detailed Drivers, and Groundlink.
