= Move America Forward =

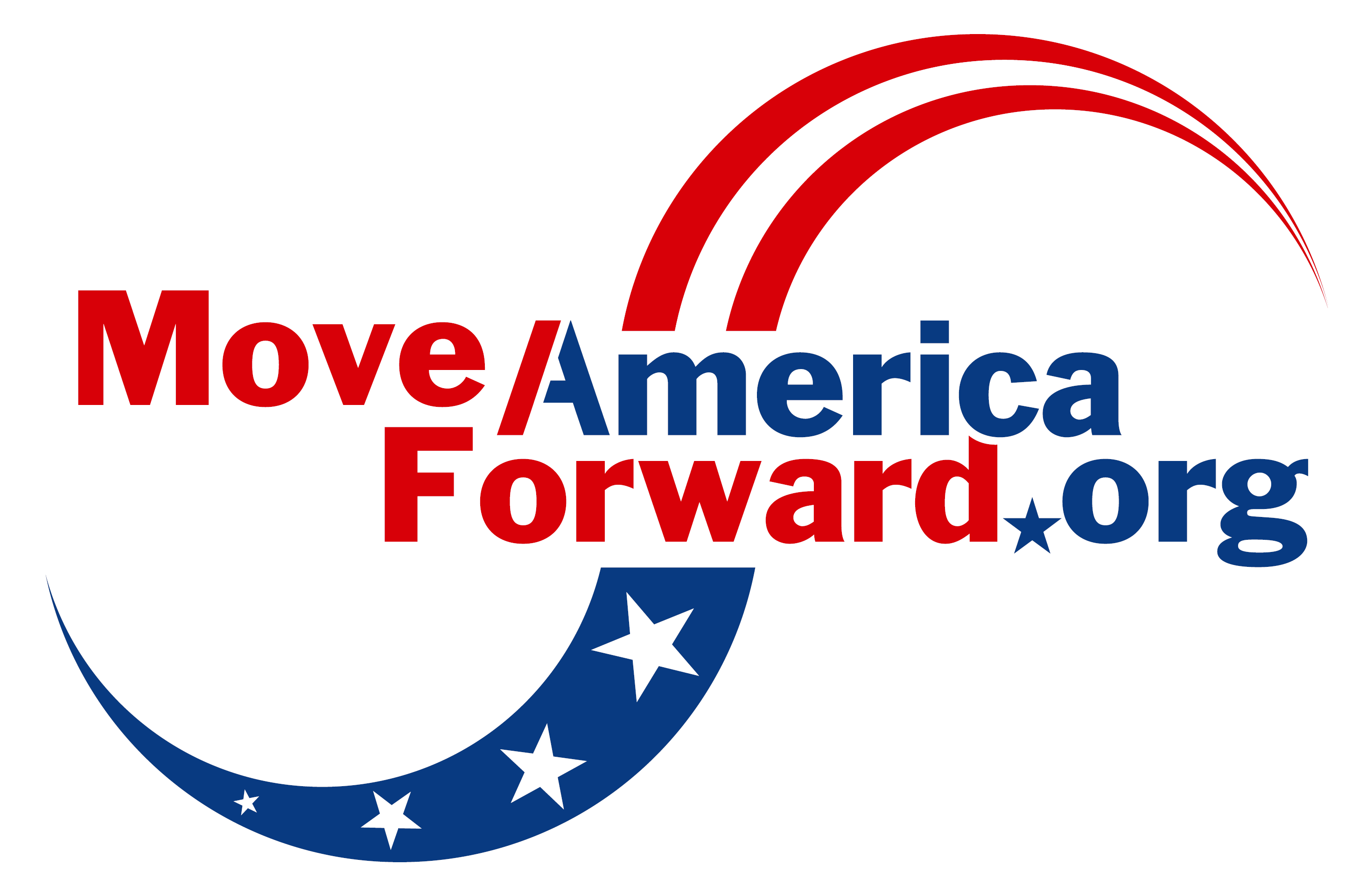
- Formation: 2004
- Founders: Sal Russo, Howard Kaloogian, Melanie Morgan
- Type: Nonprofit
- Purpose: Support United States Armed Forces in Iraq and Afghanistan
- Headquarters: Sacramento, California
- Website: www.moveamericaforward.org

Move America Forward is a nonprofit military charity based in Sacramento, California. Howard Kaloogian, Melanie Morgan and Sal Russo established the organization in 2004. The organization supports front-line United States Armed Forces troops serving in Iraq and Afghanistan. On March 20, 2024, the charity announced it was changing its name to Troopathon, after the annual fundraising event that it holds.

== History ==
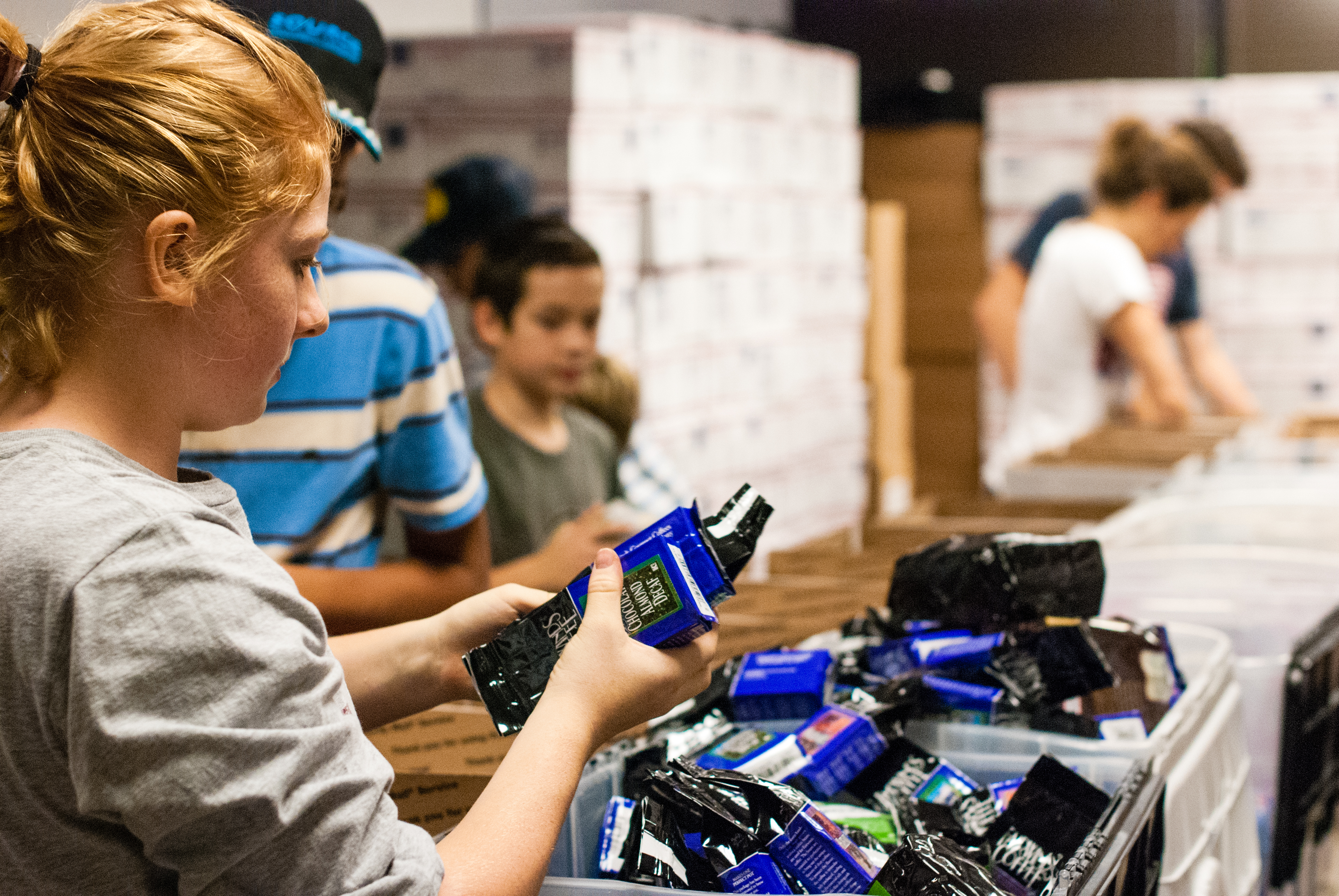
Move America Forward volunteers sorting materials to put in care packages.

Sal Russo, Melanie Morgan and Howard Kaloogian formed Move America Forward in 2004.

In 2005, the organization took its first trip to Iraq called Voices of Soldiers tour. Soldiers were interviewed to share their stories in the success in the fight against terrorism during the trip. That August, Move America Forward sponsored a You don't speak for me, Cindy! tour to counter Cindy Sheehan's protest at President Bush's Prairie Chapel Ranch and the vigils held in her support. The following year, Move America Forward sponsored Trip Gold Star, the organization's second trip to Iraq. The trip to Kurdistan, including Gold Star Moms, was for the parents of fallen American soldiers to see where their sons and daughters made the ultimate sacrifice. That year, the organization introduced its Care package for the troops program. The program sends care packages including coffee, cookies, beef jerky, Gatorade, and other requested items to troops year around.

Move America Forward held its first "Honoring our Heroes at the Holidays" national bus tour in 2007. The tour traveled to over 40 cities in the United States and collected over 200,000 Christmas, Hanukkah and holiday cards for American troops. That year, a third trip to Iraq was led by spokeswoman Debbie Lee. The Move America Forward delegation visited troops in Ramadi, at Camp Marc Lee named after Debbie Lee's son, the first Navy SEAL to be killed in the war in Iraq. In 2008, Move America Forward sent a delegation to Guantanamo Bay to thank troops for their service. The trip was organized by Kylie Williams, the official ambassador for veterans' advocacy for the State of Florida. The second Honoring our Heroes at the Holidays national bus tour collected over 200,000 cards that year. That year, Move America Forward hosted the first Troopathon, an online fundraiser, to raise money to send care packages to troops.

K9 Care Packages, a program to support military working dogs and their handlers, was launched by the organization in October 2011. Move America Forward was named "Top-rated Nonprofit" by Great Nonprofits in 2014 and 2015. That March, the Rogers Family Company donated coffee and tea to Move America Forward for troops. Stag Arms partnered with the organization for the 2014 Troopathon in July.

In June 2015, Move America Forward hosted its 8th annual Troopathon fundraiser to help send care packages to American troops deployed in war zones overseas. The organization raised over $280,000. State Assemblyman Devon Mathis, Hulk Hogan, Rush Limbaugh, Sean Hannity, Mark Levin, Geraldo Rivera, Brian Kilmeade, Dennis Miller, Adam Carolla, Herman Cain, Ted Nugent, Jerry Bruckheimer, Joe Theismann, Tony Orlando, and Nancy Grace made appearances on the broadcast that year. Prior to the 2015 Chattanooga shootings on July 16, 2015, Move America Forward advocated for more security at military recruiting centers. After the shooting, the organization released a statement in support of lawmakers that wants to allow military recruiters to carry firearms.

In 2016, Move America Forward partnered with the Wounded Warrior Project to send care packages to troops overseas to show support for those away from their families during the holiday season.

Move America Forward received a 2 out of 4 star rating from Charity Navigator. Guidestar rated the organization as a Platinum Participant.

== Policies and programs ==
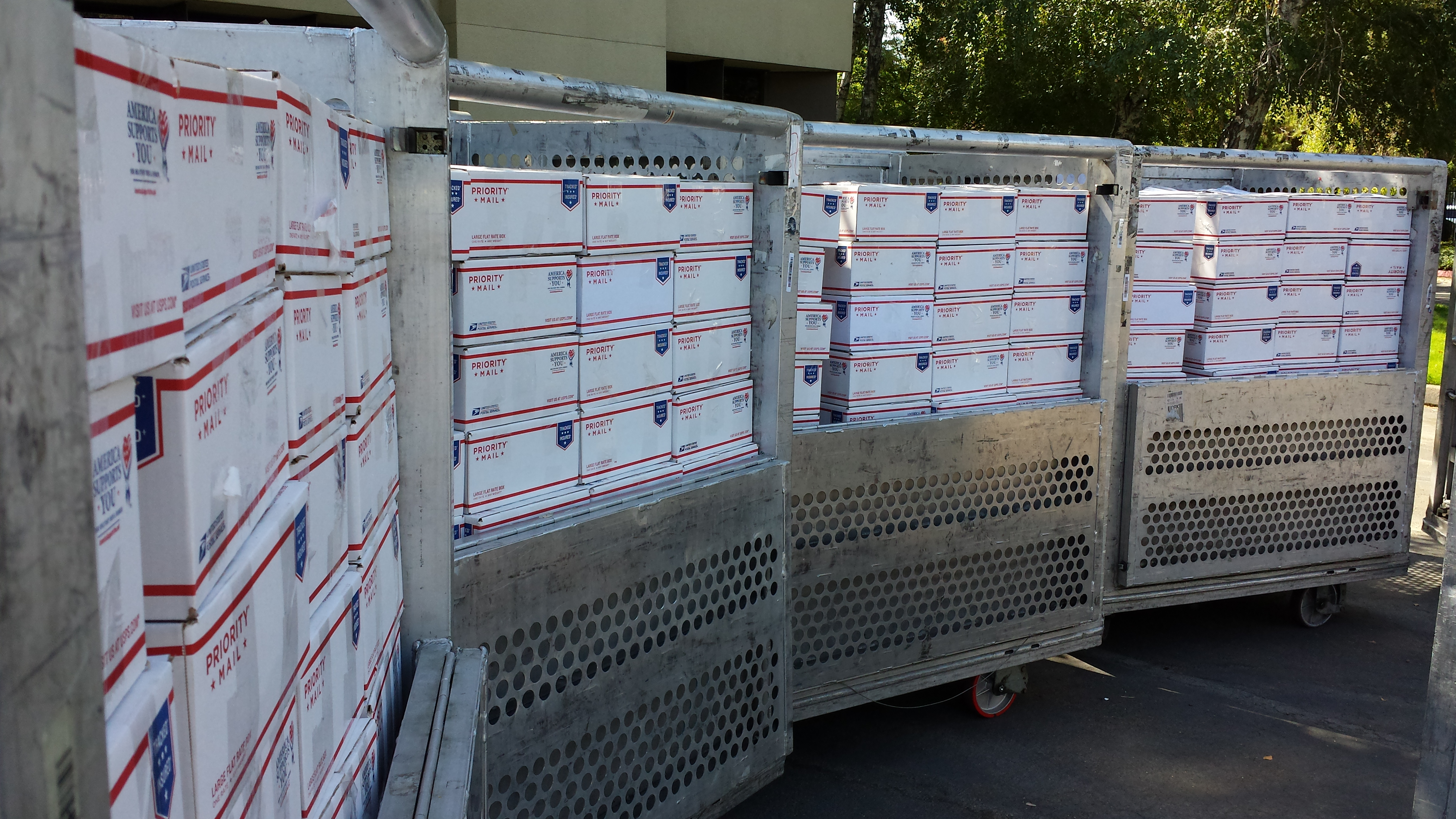
Care packages ready for shipping.

The organization annually hosts "Troopathon", an 8-hour live online broadcast that it says it uses to help send packages to American troops. The fundraiser hosts movie stars, TV personalities, elected officials, professional athletes, musicians, talk radio hosts and many other supporters.

In a partnership with the Jelly Belly Company, Move America Forward introduced a program where soldiers would receive specially wrapped 2 oz. bags of jelly bellies to use as gift to the native people they were in contact on a daily basis with. Each specially marked package displays these words in English, Arabic, and Pashto language: "A gift from the America People in hope that your country will one day enjoy the freedom and opportunities that we have in the United States."

== Controversy ==
In 2014, ProPublica released a report accusing Move America Forward of giving a percentage of its donations to for-profit companies run by people affiliated with Tea Party Express.
