= National Association of Health Underwriters =

U.S. professional organization

National Association of Benefits and Insurance Professionals
- Formation: 1930
- Headquarters: Washington, DC, United States
- Members: 20,000
- Key people: Jessica Brooks-Woods, CEO
- Website: www.NABIP.org

The National Association of Benefits and Insurance Professionals (NABIP) is a U.S. non-profit professional association organized to promote the common business interests of those engaged in the sale of health insurance services and to advance public knowledge for the need and benefit of health insurance products and services.

== History ==
NABIP was founded by J.P. Collins, L.D. Edson, A.G. MacKinnon and George Brown in 1930 and chartered June 5, 1930 at the Edgewater Beach Hotel in Chicago.

== Membership ==
NABIP is an organization for individuals who are active in the health insurance industry. Its membership represents all segments of the health insurance business but the nucleus of the organization has always been agents.

== Governing structure ==
NABIP is governed by an executive board. Since September 1, 2023, Jessica Brooks-Woods has been the executive vice president and CEO, while a new president of the board is elected by membership every year.

== Meetings ==
NABIP sponsors two industry meetings every year. Capitol Conference is held every year in Washington, DC, while the Annual Convention and Exhibition is held in a different U.S. city each year.

== Activities ==
NABIP has taken an active role in Health care reform in the United States, including presenting testimony before Congress and participating in lobbying efforts.

NABIP PAC is a licensed political action committee that raises money for candidates who support business-driven health care reform. The NABIP Education Foundation helps insurance agents keep up-to-date on licensing classes required by each state's Department of Insurance. NABIP helps individuals find private health insurance through its "Find an Agent" feature.
