= SFA Fund =

Main fundraising arm of the 2024 Nikki Haley presidential campaign

- Legal status: Super PAC
- Leader: Mark Harris
- Website: www.standforamericapac.com

SFA Fund Inc. is a single-candidate super PAC which supported Nikki Haley in her campaign for the 2024 Republican presidential nomination. According to OpenSecrets, the super PAC raised $88,885,512.

== Description ==
Stand for America Fund began as a single-candidate Carey committee led by Republican strategist Mark Harris.

Katie Reid, a regional political coordinator for the Republican National Committee, has been SFA Fund's treasurer since 2023. Reid replaced Les Williamson, a former staffer for both the National Republican Senatorial Committee and Senator Mitch McConnell.

According to OpenSecrets, the super PAC spent over $75,000,000 on campaign ads during the 2023-2024 election cycle.

== Activities ==
In early January 2024, The New York Times reported that the fund had out-raised Donald Trump's "Make America Great Again Inc." super PAC in the second half of 2023, with $50.1 million to Trump's $46 million. Bloomberg later reported that much of the PAC's donations came from "prominent Wall Street executives ... including Home Depot co-founder Ken Langone as well as LinkedIn co-founder and Democratic donor Reid Hoffman."

That same month, SFA Fund had paid more than $23 million to run TV and digital ads, according to data from AdImpact, a service that tracks political advertising and spending. Many of the ads are supportive of Haley, her record and her proposed policies. The PAC also funded attack ads on other candidates, specifically Florida governor Ron DeSantis and President Joe Biden, the Democratic candidate Haley was expecting to face if she won the Republican primary.

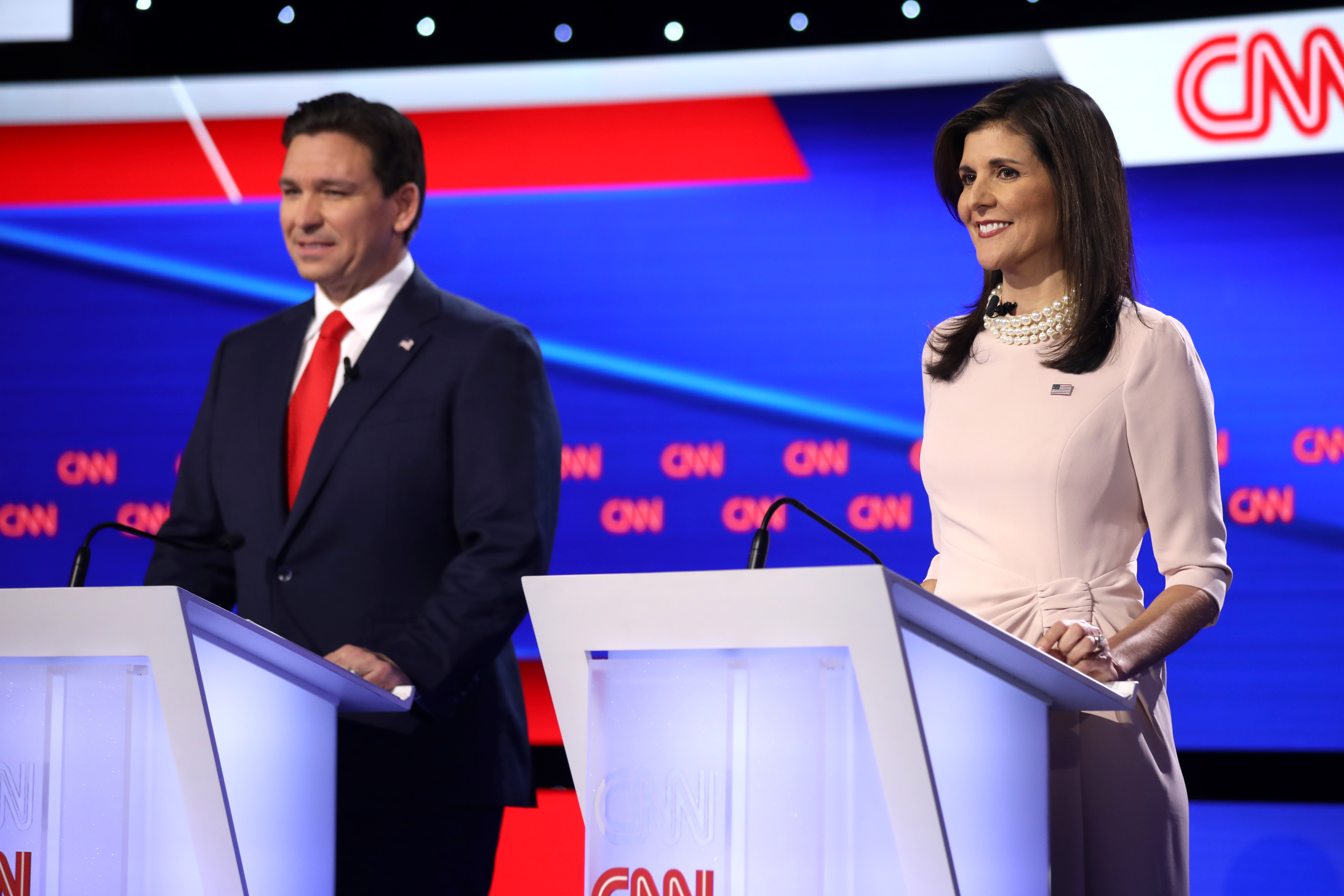
Haley and DeSantis at the CNN Republican Presidential Debate (2024)

FactCheck.org accused SFA Fund of making false claims against primary challenger DeSantis in early 2024, after the fund aired an ad in Iowa misattributing a quote about China to DeSantis, while displaying an image of the governor with the Chinese flag. The same ad also claimed that DeSantis “allowed a Chinese military contractor to expand just miles from a U.S. Naval base,” citing a New York Post article. FactCheck.org reviewed both claims, and found them to be false.

As of June 30, 2024, the fund had raised roughly $18.7 million, according to its filings with the Federal Election Commission. The PAC received $15 million in contributions from billionaire Jan Koum, co-founder of WhatsApp, and $5 million each from Ken Griffin, founder of Citadel LLC, and Paul Singer, founder of Elliott Management.

In late November, Forbes reported that the super PAC had spent an additional $3.6 million on anti-DeSantis ads, primarily in Iowa and New Hampshire, which hold the first two nominating contests in the primary process.
