= Fizz (disambiguation) =

Fizz usually refers to effervescence.

"Fizz" may also refer to:

- Fizz (cider), a brand of cider
- Fizz (cocktail), a mixed drink
- Fizz, nickname of cricketer Mustafizur Rahman
- Fizz (novel), a 2011 novel by Zvi Schreiber
- The Fizz, a British pop music group
- The FIZZ, a 2006–2007 TV program
- Fizz (band), a British supergroup
- Fizz Mobile, a Canadian mobile virtual network operator owned by Vidéotron

== Fictional characters ==
- Fizzarolli "Fizz" and Robo Fizz, characters in the animated series Helluva Boss, voiced by Alex Brightman and Remy Edgerly
- Fizz, a character in the video game League of Legends
- Fizz, a character in the children's TV show Tweenies

== See also ==
- Fiz (disambiguation)
- Bucks Fizz (disambiguation)
- Ffizz, a British television sitcom
- Fiz Brown, a character in TV soap opera Coronation Street
