= Economy of Greater Oslo =

Economy of a region of Norway

The economy of the Greater Oslo area in Norway's southeast region plays an important role in the country's overall national economy. The Norwegian capital was named the 'priciest city in the world' in 2006 by the Economist Intelligence Unit, which compared the cost of living in 130 cities in a survey and ranked its findings.

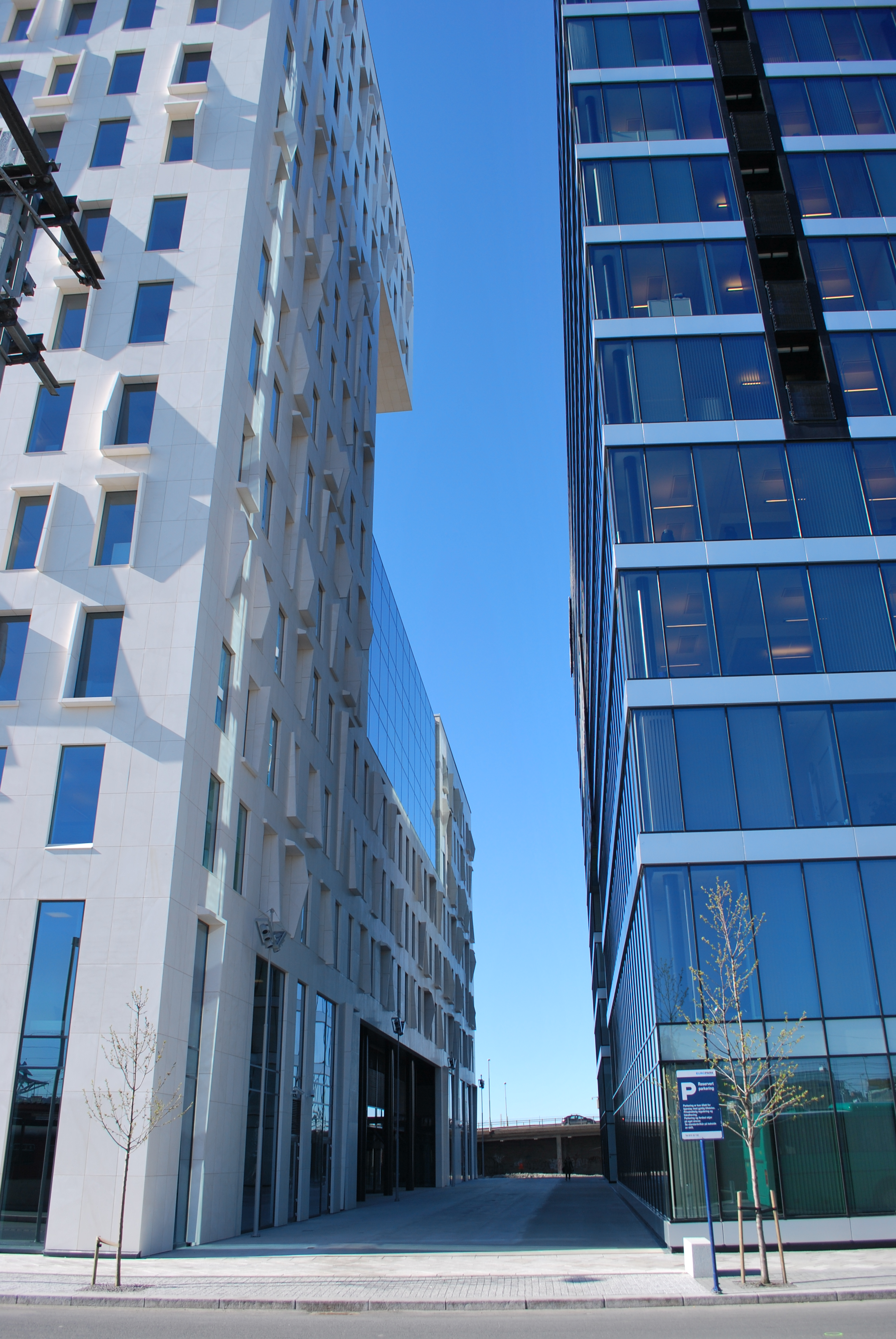
PWC office building to the right and KLP office

In the maritime sector alone, Oslo is home to approximately 980 companies and 8,500 employees, accounting for some of the world's largest shipping firms, shipbrokers, and insurance brokers. The nearby Det Norske Veritas (DNV), headquartered in Høvik, Norway, is one of the three major maritime ship classification organizations worldwide. As a non-governmental agency, the DNV establishes and maintains technical standards for the construction and operation of ships and offshore structures, with about 16.5% of the world fleet in its register.

== Industrial features ==
Inside city limits, the Port of Oslo features a large general cargo area, accommodating an annual tally of approximately 6,000 ships, 6 million tons of cargo and over five million passengers. The gross domestic product of Oslo totaled NOK268 billion (€34 billion) in 2003, which amounted to 17% of the national GDP. This compares with NOK166 billion (€21 billion) in 1995. The metropolitan area, bar Moss and Drammen, contributed 25% of the national GDP in 2003 and was also responsible for more than one quarter of tax revenues. In comparison, total tax revenues from the oil and gas industry on the Norwegian Continental Shelf amounted to about 16%.

== Cost of living ==
Oslo was named one of the most expensive cities in the world in 2006. That year, the city ranked tenth in a worldwide cost-of-living index provided by Mercer Human Resource Consulting. The city took first place - for being the priciest city in which to live - in a separate survey through the Economist Intelligence Unit, division of the London-based media company The Economist Newspaper Limited. In 2018, Zurich was named the most expensive city, followed by Geneva in second place and Oslo in third by the Swiss bank, UBS.

== Energy ==
The Oslo region possesses a unique competency gained through its central role in 100 years of hydropower production and close to 40 years of offshore petroleum development. Oslo is the main location for Norwegian research and development, and many of the institutions are clustered in the area around the University of Oslo, the largest in Northern Europe. At the University of Oslo several research groups are engaged in energy research, including work on new renewable energy sources and petroleum-related issues. Other important institutions in this field are the Norwegian Geotechnical Research Institute, Centre for International Climate and Environmental Research, the Norwegian Building Research Institute (energy efficiency, ventilation technology and indoor air quality) and the Norwegian Meteorological Institute. The Foundation for Scientific and Industrial Research, with its 1800 employees, is the largest independent research organisation in Scandinavia. SINTEF's headquarters are in Trondheim, but it conducts extensive research activities, primarily within oil and gas exploration and production, in the Gaustadbekk Valley. Located in the heart of the Gaustadbekk Valley, the Oslo Innovation Center is the leading business incubator in the region. The park is strongly committed to the commercialisation of ideas and results from research environments through creating favourable conditions for business start-ups. The center has recently constructed an environmental technology wing to accommodate the ever-growing need for research into Renewable energy and climate-friendly technologies.

== ICT ==
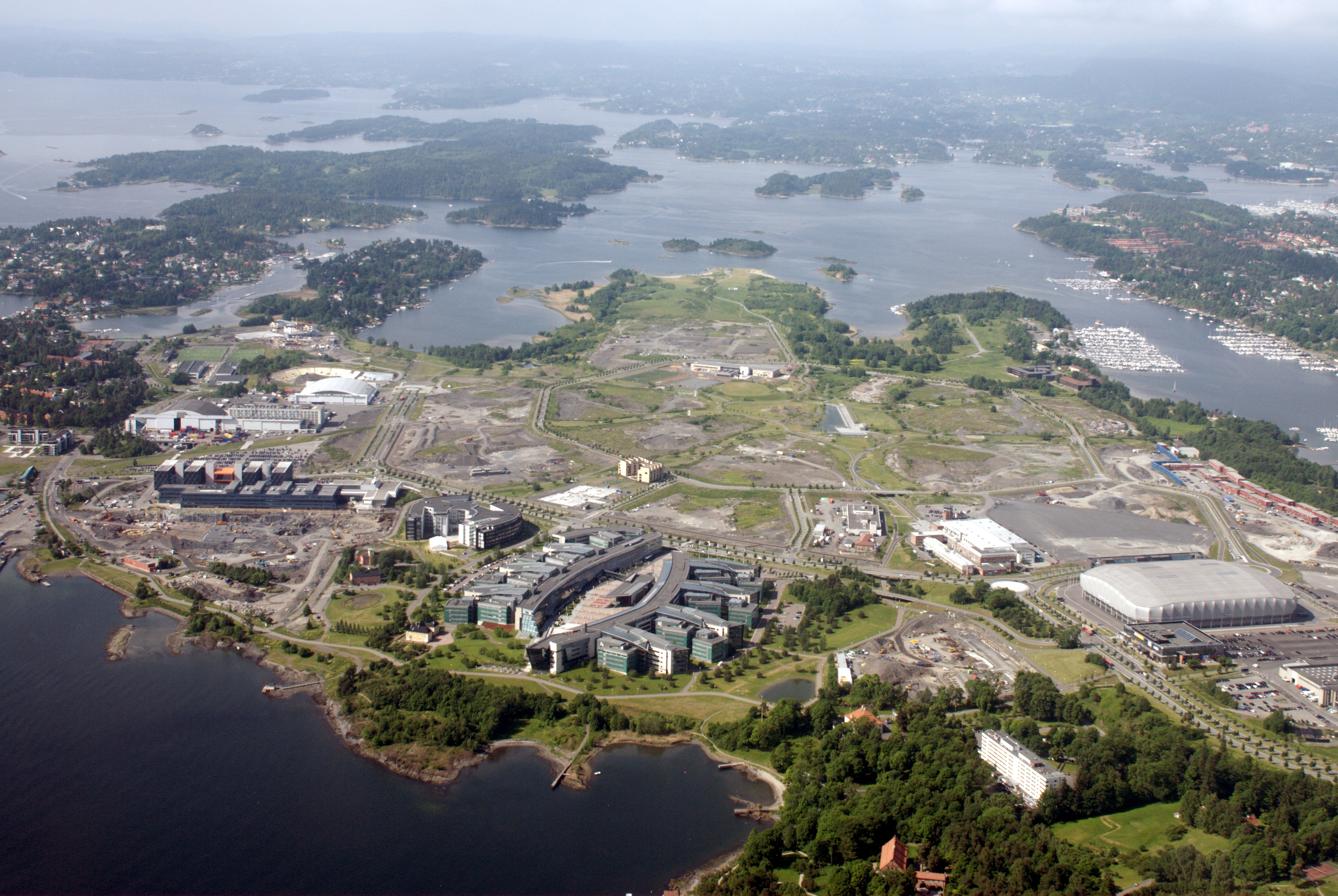
Fornebu, west of Bygdøy is the ever-changing IT district in Oslo where Telenor's headquarters are located. Telenor Arena can be seen on the right.

Norway is among the world's leading information societies and is widely regarded as having a highly developed mobile market. The Oslo region is a key driver and centre for research, development and business. A combination of unique expertise, strong R&D environments and advanced users with high purchasing power has made the Oslo region an excellent test market for new and innovative ICT products. Recent years have witnessed a large number of business start-ups in the region, and several internationally renowned companies have chosen to locate there such as Google Inc and Microsoft Norway. The Norwegian topography lends itself to mobile communication with its vast and practically impenetrable mountainous areas and plateaus—factors which have made Norway a pioneer in new communication techniques and advanced technologies. Norwegian research contribution was crucial when the world's first automatic mobile net NMT 450 was launched in 1981, and today's global GSM-standard was invented in Norway by Telenor. Many promising companies are contributing to the growing mobile and wireless cluster in Oslo. Wireless Future (Trådløs Fremtid) is established as a cluster building initiative, involving most of the key players from business and R&D in Norway. Tandberg is known for its video conference systems and the Kongsberg Group has developed a wide spectrum of technological products for the defence and maritime industry. The list of companies with international success are rising, with prime examples like Opera Software, the game producer Funcom and Chipcon, which in 2006 was sold to Texas Instruments. FAST, which has become a global market leader in search engineers, has been appointed a Norwegian Centre for Research-based Innovation (SFI) thanks to its Information Access.

Telenor, Norway's largest ICT-company, with head office located at Fornebu, just outside Oslo is emerging as one of the fastest growing providers of mobile communications services worldwide. Aventi Technology is also headquartered at Økern in Oslo. In 2007, Telenor surpassed 136 million mobile subscriptions worldwide, placing it as the 7th largest mobile operator in the world. The Telenor Group was ranked the best Mobile Telecom company in the world by the Sustainability Yearbook 2008. With the Department of Informatics, the University of Oslo is the largest educational institution for ICT within the region. Together with the Norwegian Computing Center and SINTEF, the Department of Informatics provides Norway with an important research environment for ICT. Other renowned R&D environments are found at Fornebu, Kjeller, Halden and Horten.

== Maritime ==
Norway's maritime industry is built on the expertise gained from centuries as a shipping nation, with Oslo at the main centre. Maritime companies locate in Oslo to be part of a complete and innovative cluster of shipping companies and a range of specialized maritime services. For investors and partners, the strength and the international position of the maritime cluster in Oslo offers many attractive opportunities. In a special report on Oslo from November 12, 2008, Lloyd's List highlights the diversity and strength of the Oslo maritime cluster. According to Lloyd's, "Oslo remains Norway's largest hub for international shipping and related industries with a range of businesses from shipping to financial services and maritime research, with few rivals worldwide". Though Norway is still feeling the repercussions of a long tax debate, Lloyd's characterizes the concentration of shipowners based in the Norwegian capital as "impressive". With the advent of a favourable shipping tax, Oslo shipowners together with leading service companies have turned their attention to developing high-tech and environmentally friendly solutions for the industry. Leading classification society Det Norske Veritas (DNV) is a major contributor to these developments, with a range of research initiatives connected to green shipping, safety and the environment. The financial sector in Oslo continues to support industry activity, with Oslo Børs and Imarex trading shipping shares and freight derivatives, maritime banking giants DnB NOR and Nordea, and leading brokerage houses like Fearnlys, Pareto and RS Platou. Oslo Maritime Network (OMN) is a non-profit collaborative network organisation gathering members from all segments of the maritime cluster in Norway's capital region.

== Research ==
In 2004, the Oslo region was ranked six on innovation in a comparison with the regions of the European Union. The Oslo region gets top scores on lifelong learning, working population with tertiary education and public R&D expenses per capita. But it is also among Europe’s most developed regions in relation to high-tech employment and innovation co-operation in medium-sized enterprises.

At the national level, the 2005 European Innovation Scoreboard shows that Norway is one of the most innovative countries in Europe in relation to the most innovative sectors, i.e. business services and computer and related activities. The knowledge environment in the Oslo region is the force behind an international level of R&D in a number of specialist areas. With short distances and a transparent community, it is easy to develop interdisciplinary collaboration. The University of Oslo holds four Nobel Prizes and is the largest knowledge institution in the region, with 30 000 students and 4 600 employees. It is located at Gaustad/Blindern, the prime location for R&D in the city of Oslo. Other R&D hubs in the region are found at Ås, Kjeller, Kongsberg, Fornebu, Horten and Halden. Cost-saving technology is a top priority for Norwegian businesses and Norwegians are quick to pick up new and innovative technological products and ideas and use them in their daily lives. The European Innovation Scoreboard 2003 puts Norway second after Denmark on its innovation take-up barometer. Norwegians use on average only four years to start using new technologies and Norway in general and the Oslo region in particular are excellent testbeds for new innovative technological products and ideas. The Oslo region has seen a strong growth of actors in the regional innovation support system in recent years. The regional innovation support system is made up of 23 different actors, including technology transfer offices, science parks, business incubators, venture capitalists and a range of other companies and programmes providing support and assistance in the process of commercialising research-based ideas and helping entrepreneurs developing their businesses into the international marketplace.

== See also ==
- Economy of Norway
