= Baltic Exchange =

UK shipping owners marketplace

Coordinates: 51.5151°N 0.0802°W

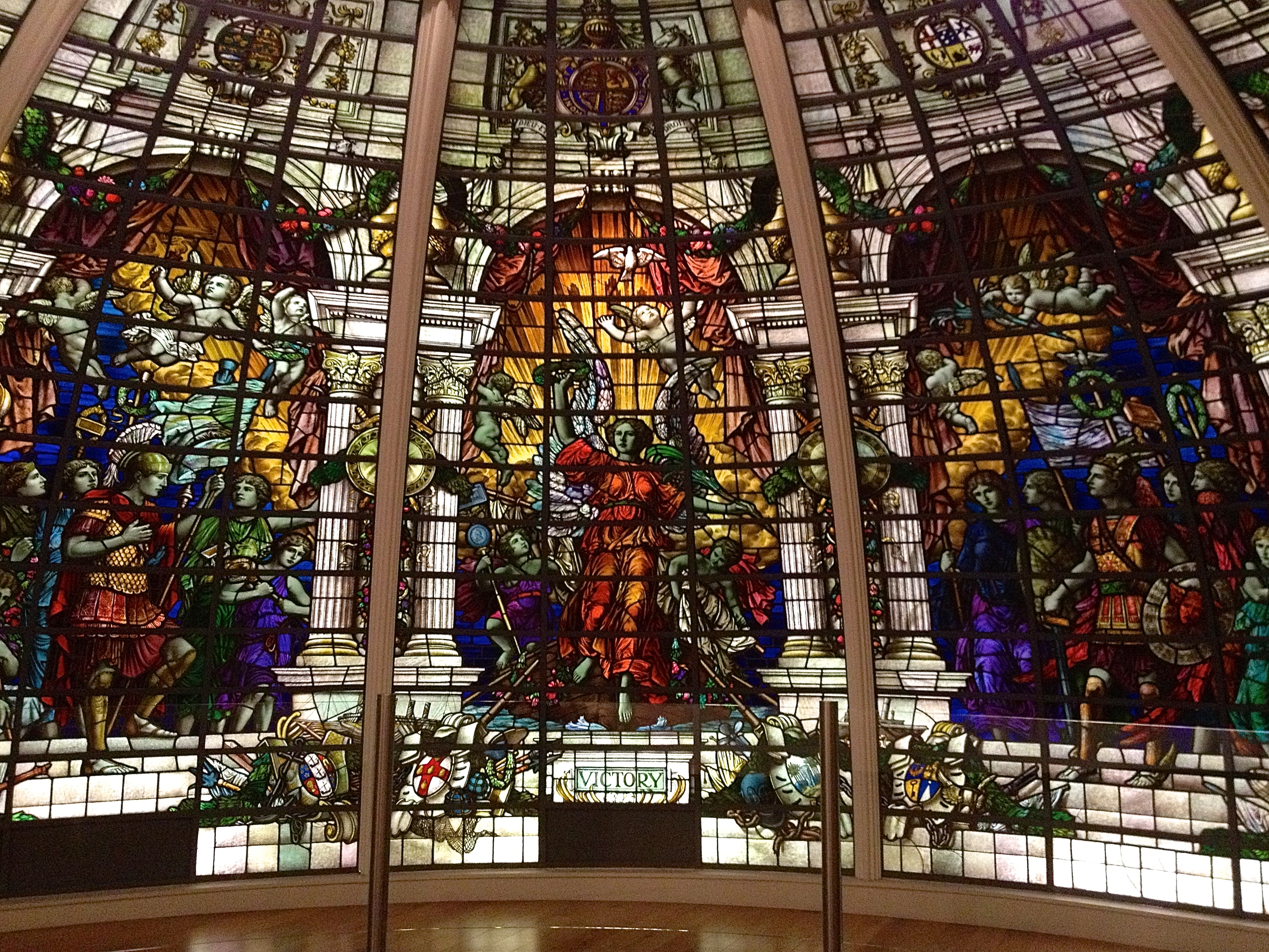
- The Baltic Exchange Memorial Glass, now at the National Maritime Museum
- Type: Maritime membership and data organisation
- Location: City of London, England
- Founded: 1744
- Owner: SGX
- Key people: Guy Hindley (Chairman); Mark Jackson (CEO); Janet Sykes (CCO); Mark Read (CFO)
- Currency: GBP
- Indices: Baltic Dry Index; Baltic Panamax Index; Baltic Capesize Index; Baltic Supramax Index; Baltic Handysize Index; Baltic Dirty Tanker Index; Baltic Clean Tanker Index
- Website: balticexchange.com

The Baltic Exchange (incorporated as The Baltic Exchange Limited) is a British financial services company and membership organisation for the maritime industry, and freight market information provider for the trading and settlement of chartering and derivative contracts.

Situated since Edwardian times at 24-28 St Mary Axe in the City of London, the building was destroyed by a bomb in 1992. Its headquarters are now at 77 Leadenhall Street, with further offices in Europe, across Asia, and in the United States.

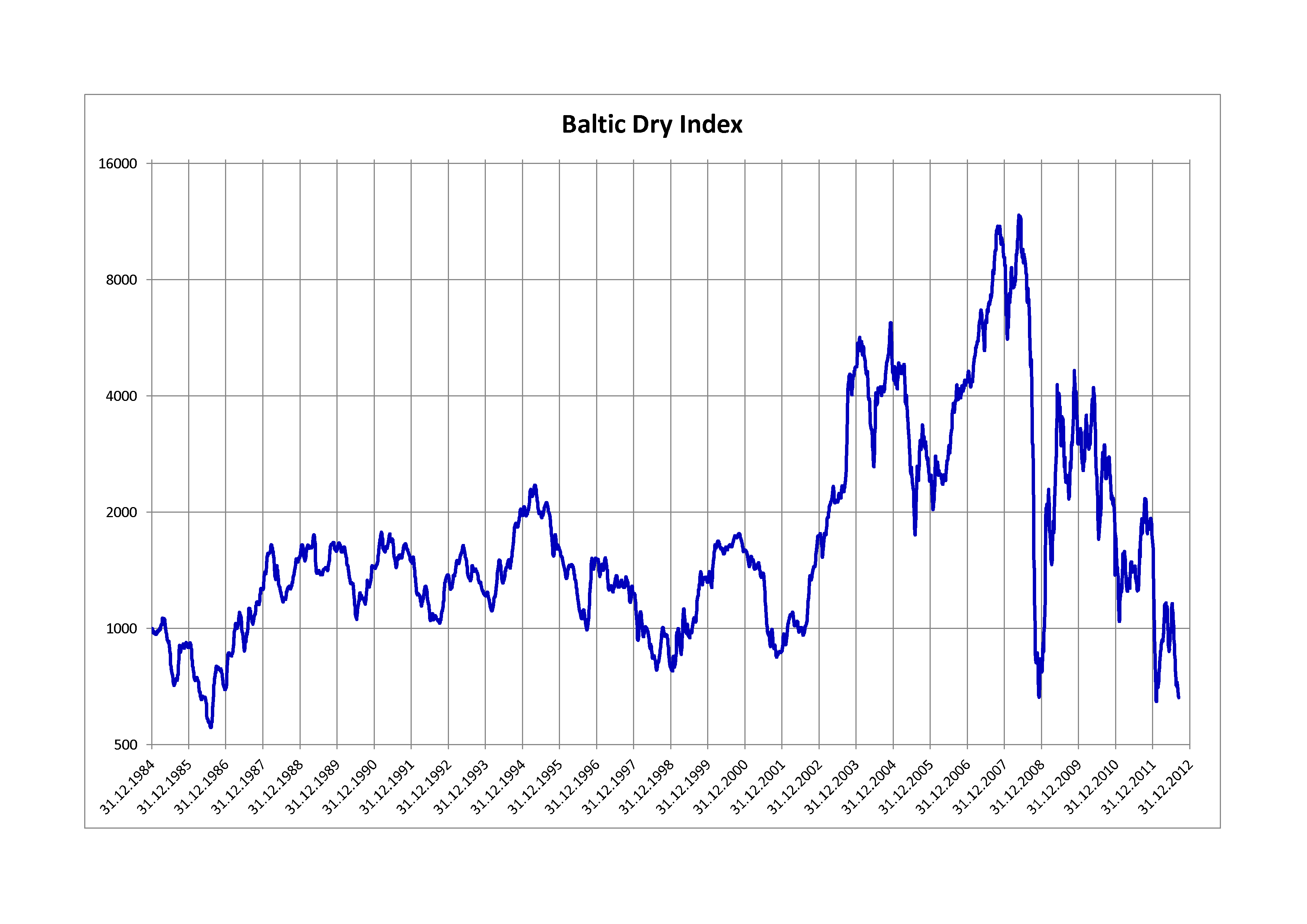
Baltic Dry Index chart

Its international community of 650 member companies encompasses the majority of world shipping interests and commits to a code of business conduct overseen by the Baltic Exchange: its members are responsible for a large proportion of all dry cargo and tanker fixtures as well as the sale and purchase of merchant vessels.

== History ==
The Baltic Exchange traces its roots back to 1744 at the Virginia and Baltick Coffee House on Threadneedle Street, near the Royal Exchange. With the rapid expansion of Britain's network of global trade, London's mercantile coffee houses operated as a maritime commercial node for communication and business. As British influence in trade to Virginia began to wane after American Independence, focus shifted to the Russian Empire and other emerging markets.

Incorporated as a private limited company with shares owned by its members on 17 January 1900, the Baltic Exchange was acquired in November 2016 by the Singapore Exchange (SGX) and remains headquartered in London.

== Services ==
The exchange provides daily freight market prices and maritime shipping cost indices which are used to guide freight traders as to the current level of various global shipping markets, as well as being used to set freight contract rates and settle freight futures (known as Forward freight agreements or FFAs). Historically operating on its trading floor, Baltic members' transactions are nowadays primarily conducted via other means of communication (eg. telephone, e-mail, instant messaging etc), although face-to-face client meetings remain integral to building trust.

The exchange is the source of market-wide information and publishes seven daily indices made up from a suite of "wet" (oil tanker) and "dry" (bulk carrier) bench-marked time-charter and voyage routes:

- Baltic Dry Index (BDI)
- Baltic Panamax Index (BPI)
- Baltic Capesize Index (BCI)
- Baltic Supramax Index (BSI)
- Baltic Handysize Index (BHSI)
- Baltic Dirty Tanker Index (BDTI)
- Baltic Clean Tanker Index (BCTI)
- Baltic LNG Tanker Index (BLNG)

In April 2018, the Baltic Exchange announced a global container index called the Freightos Baltic Index (FBX) in partnership with Freightos. Liquified natural gas (LNG) assessments launched in 2019.

The Baltic Exchange has 42 global panellists, largely shipbrokers, and more than 5,000 members.

The exchange also provides forward curves, a dry cargo fixture list, sale and purchase values, LPG & LNG assessments, daily market news, and the market settlement data for freight derivative contracts.

=== BIFFEX ===
BIFFEX, the Baltic International Freight Futures Exchange, was a London-based exchange for trading ocean freight futures contracts with settlement based on the Baltic Freight Index. It started trading dry cargo freight futures contracts in 1985, and was modestly successful for some years. All contracts were cleared by the ICCH (International Commodities Clearing House), later renamed London Clearing House and now LCH.Clearnet. A tanker freight futures contract was introduced in 1986, but never became popular and was suspended indefinitely the same year. Volumes in the dry cargo contracts dwindled over the years, and the contracts ceased trading due to lack of liquidity in 2001.

== Management ==
As of 2025, the Baltic Exchange's management comprises:

- Chairman: Guy Hindley
- Chief Executive: Mark Jackson
- Chief Financial Officer and Company Secretary: Mark Read
- Chief Commercial Officer: Janet Sykes
- Communications Manager: Bill Lines.

Past chairmen include:

- Frank Emil Fehr (1937-1939)

== Premises ==
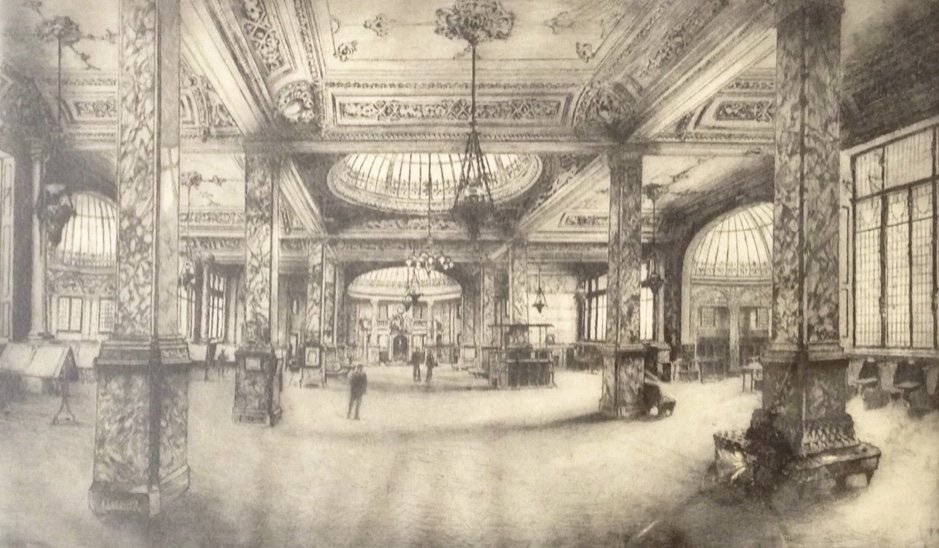
Engraving by Joseph Finnemore of the Baltic Exchange Hall dated 1918

The exchange was historically located at 24–28 St Mary Axe in the City of London until it was destroyed in 1992 by a terrorist bomb attack.

The grandeur of the Baltic's interior is depicted by Joseph Finnemore's steel engraving in 1918 of its Exchange Hall trading floor.

Now based at 77 Leadenhall Street, London EC3, the Baltic Exchange has further offices in Europe, Asia, and the United States.

== See also ==
- Shipping markets
