= SCFI =

SCFI may refer to:

- Shanghai Containerised Freight Index (SCFI, or CCFI - China/Chinese Containerized Freight Index), a type of economic transport shipping index. See Container Freight Swap Agreement
- Secretaría de Comercio y Fomento Industrial [English: Secretariat of Commerce and Industrial Development], the former name for the Department of Economy in Mexico; see Secretariat of Economy
- ICAO airport code for Fundo Tehuén Airport, Los Lagos, Chile
- Society for the Confluence of Festivals in India, see Gorehabba
- Straticharge Continuous Fuel-Injection system, see Gasoline direct injection
