= Shipping cycle =

Type of economic cycle

A shipping market cycle or shipping cycle is a particular type of economic cycle. These cycles correct markets when supply and demand are out of balance. Shipping markets are driven by freight rates, which can move up, move down or remain unchanged. Shipping cycles are therefore determined by the fluctuations of these freight rates.

== Classification by duration ==
Shipping cycles are classified according to the time interval in which the alternating movements of freight rates are observed:

1. Seasonal cycles (fluctuations occurring within one year)
2. Short cycles (ranging from 3 to 12 years)
3. Long cycles or trends (approx. 50 years)

The exact lengths of short and long cycles are not constant and the durations given are rough estimates. Shipping markets are very volatile and involve higher levels of uncertainty when compared to the world economy as a whole.

=== Seasonal cycles ===
Seasonal cycles appear within one year and typically correspond to seasonal changes in demand and supply of products. These changes cause fluctuations in the demand and supply of ship chartering, which in turn influences freight rates.

=== Short cycles ===
Short cycles occur at varying time intervals, ranging from 3 to 12 years. Typically, a short shipping cycle consists of four different stages:

1. Trough (low freight rates, decreasing to the operating cost of the least efficient vessels; low demand and excess supply)
2. Recovery (rising freight rates; increasing demand moves supply and demand towards equilibrium)
3. Peak (high freight rates, increasing to 2-3 times the operating cost of vessels; supply and demand at or near equilibrium)
4. Collapse (falling freight rates; supply exceeds demand)

Each stage corresponds with different freight rates and changing levels of demand and supply. The pattern of these four stages in a short cycle is irregular and unpredictable: the duration of a single stage can vary from months to years. The ranges of the freight rates (from lowest to highest level one cycle) fluctuate between cycles as well.

=== Long cycles ===
Long cycles are routinely referred to as trends in economics. Trends are the long term upward, downward or stagnating levels of freight rates around which short cycles oscillate. They are hard to identify and different causes are given for their occurrence.

== See also ==
- Economic cycle
- Shipping markets
- Freight rate
