= The FIZZ =

US television program

- Presented by: Cory "Mr. Safety" Williams; Jessica "JP" Payne

Production
- Running time: 30 minutes

Original release
- Network: DirecTV
- Release: 2006

The FIZZ is a half-hour weekly television program hosted by Cory "Mr. Safety" Williams and Jessica "JP" Payne. The television program was created by Andrew Kobliska, for DirecTV Original Entertainment. The show features video bloggers, aspiring hosts, online videos and indie music videos.

The program premiered in November 2006 on The 101 Network on DirecTV. The entertainment trade publication Variety called The FIZZ "easily consumed... a liberating approach to TV programming." Eric Shanks, Executive Vice President of DirecTV Original Entertainment said in a recent ITV interview, "The FIZZ will essentially be the video bloggers show. Everyone has tried to find a way to bring the internet to television and we think we've cracked the code with this show."

The FIZZ has made such a strong impact on DirecTV subscribers that it later expanded to include a special Newzz edition hosted by Peter Zottolo. One of the program's videoblogger contributors, Pittsburgh native Digital Soul began his career as a video blogger who chronicled his weight loss in Internet videos viewed more than 2 million times. His popularity earned him a guest host spot on The FIZZ. Each week, The FIZZ featured some of the best-known vloggers including TheWineKone, TheHill88, spricket24, Mark Day Comedy, Jay Lamont, Boh3m3, Blunty3000, The Angry Aussie, Beth and Val and the program's main host, Cory Williams.

The American version of the show led to a Spanish version that ran once on DirecTV Latin America titled "El Fizz".
