= FBX (disambiguation) =

FBX is a proprietary 3D model file format.

FBX could also refer to:

- Freightos Baltic Index, stock index
- F-box protein, a kind of protein
- Febuxostat, a drug
- Fairbrix, one of the precursors to the Litecoin cryptocurrency
