= Container Freight Swap Agreement =

Type of financial futures contract

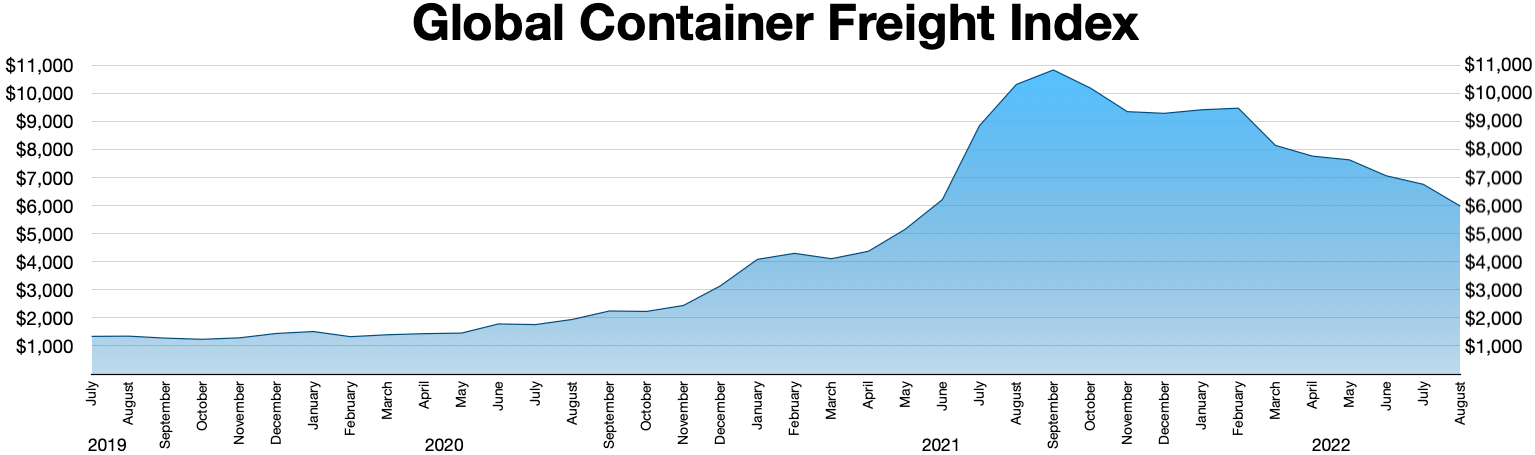
Global Container Freight Index July 2019 - December 2021

Container Freight Swap Agreements are a financial futures contract that allow for hedging and speculating against the volatility of seaborne, intermodal container box-rates.

A container freight swaps most commonly takes the form of a cash-settled agreement between two parties with an equal and opposite opinion of the future of the market. The parties agree on a price in US$ per container for a given number of containers on an agreed route during a specified period. At the end of the contract period the parties settle the difference in cash between the predetermined contract price and the actual spot market price.

If the market strengthens, and box rates increase, then the buyer of a CFSA (the long position) benefits, since by entering the agreement they have effectively paid less, in advance, for the goods than they would have done trading on the spot market. The buyer of the CFSA has successfully hedged against an increase in cost of the underlying physical market.

Conversely, if the market softens, and box rates decrease, the seller of the CFSA benefits since they have effectively sold the goods, in advance, at a higher rate than they would have done trading on the spot market. In this case the seller of the CFSA has been successful in hedging against an increase in cost of the underlying physical market.

These agreements are currently available over-the-counter with clearing at LCH. Clearnet and SGX AsiaClear against the Shanghai Containerised Freight Index (SCFI).

== See also ==
- Freight rate
- Baltic Dry Index
