= Mirror, Mirror II =

Television series

- Genre: Time travel Drama
- Created by: Hilary Bell; Posie Graeme-Evans
- Starring: Antonia Prebble; Ben Revell; Jovita Shaw; Simon James; Denise O'Connell
- Countries of origin: Australia; New Zealand
- No. of episodes: 26

Production
- Running time: 24 min.
- Production companies: Millennium Pictures; The Gibson Group

Original release
- Network: Network Ten
- Release: 11 October 1997 – 20 March 1998

Related
- Mirror, Mirror

Mirror, Mirror II is a co-production between Australia and New Zealand that was released in 1997. Unlike the first series, Mirror, Mirror, which was one story played out over a number of episodes, this series has individual adventures in each new episode, but there is a story linking them all.

== Cast ==
=== Main ===
- Simon James as Daniel McFarlane
- Ben Revell as Fergus McFarlane
- Antonia Prebble as Mandy McFarlane
- Jovita Shaw as Constance de Lutrelle
- Zoe Bertram as Violette de Lutrelle
- Tina Regtien as Jenny McFarlane
- Simon Ferry as Doug McFarlane
- Barry Quin as Gervaise de Lutrelle
- Melanie Thompson as Mai Ling
- Denise O'Connell as Aunt Lily

=== Guests ===
- Justin Rosniak as Silas Pinbody (1 episode)

== Plot ==
In this series, the mirror from the original Mirror, Mirror series has come into the hands of two other New Zealand families: the de Lutrelles and the McFarlanes. They both live in the same house, but are separated from each other by 130 years.

=== de Lutrelle family ===
Gervaise, Violette and their daughter Constance, live in the house in 1867, in that time the house is surrounded by goldfields. The family had emigrated from their home in France with vestiges of their wealth. They hope to find gold in the surrounding hills so they can restore their family's high status.

=== McFarlane family ===
Doug, Jenny and his two new stepchildren, live in the house in 1997. The troublesome Aunt Lily also lives with them. Doug, who left Daniel and his mother when he was a baby, agrees to have him come to visit from Sydney, Australia to connect and rekindle their relationship over the holidays, despite Doug's hesitation and Daniel's reticence at first.

== Episode guide ==
| No. overall | No. in season | Title | Directed by | Written by | Original release date |
|---|---|---|---|---|---|
| 1 | 1 | "Arrival" | Sophia Scheding | Greg Millin | TBA |
The series begins with the mirror appearing in the attic of a house in the country and Daniel traveling to meet his father, and new step-siblings for the first time. When he arrives at the house, he is not made to feel very welcome. His stepsister Mandy is very upset and runs off to the attic. Daniel tries to resolve the upset and goes after her. When he enters the attic he notices the reflection of a young girl in the mirror. Daniel tries to investigate but Mandy gets in his way and they stumble through the mirror into 1867. They eventually get back, but later Lily and Mandy go through the mirror. While they are in 1867, the mirror is knocked out of alignment and they cannot travel back to their own time. Trapped in 1867 they spend the night in the de Lutrelle's barn. They finally get back home when the mirror is put back into alignment.
| 2 | 2 | "Gold" | Sophia Scheding | Greg Millin | TBA |
After discovering that the de Lutrelle's were once a rich aristocratic family in France and they still have a few remnants of that wealth, Lily plots to travel through the mirror in order to steal their crown. Fergus goes through the mirror to try to help Constance but he gets sidetracked in the gold fields. He gets talking to one of the miners and trades his pocket knife for a land lease. After Daniel and Constance stop Lily from stealing the de Lutrelle's crown, she returns through the mirror and moves it so the others are trapped.
| 3 | 3 | "Trapped" | Sophia Scheding | Kristen Dunphy | TBA |
The boys are still trapped in 1867, Fergus is still busy in the gold fields, and Daniel tries to find a way to help Constance. Daniel is kicked out of the house by Gervaise, Constance's father, and Fergus gets into some trouble with the other miners, only to be rescued by Gervaise. Aunt Lily continues to lie to Doug and Jenny about where the boys are. Lily tells Daniel she will only realign the mirror if he helps her steal the crown, Daniel pretend to go along with the plan. Later on, when she sees Daniel with the crown she moves the mirror back. She goes through the mirror to snatch the crown from Daniel, they struggle, and Constance and Daniel are sent through the mirror, leaving Lily behind. They then realise the mirror has cracked in several places.
| 4 | 4 | "The Crown" | Sophia Scheding | Kristen Dunphy | TBA |
While it is damaged the mirror refuses to allow anyone to travel through. Lily, now in possession of the crown, gets Fergus to help her get it to the bank. She refuses her plea for help and she leaves him. She goes to the bank by herself. With the money she buys the de Lutrelle's house. Meanwhile, as the mirror is mending itself, Daniel, Mandy and Constance race against time to save the crown, and Fergus' life, as all traces of his life begin to disappear. Daniel rescued Fergus and Constance tries to retrieve the crown from the bank. Back in 1997 Lily goes on a spending spree with her newfound wealth, she racks up a bill of $3512, but the crown is now in the possession of the de Lutrelle's and Lily's clothes vanish, and she is left standing in her underwear.
| 5 | 5 | "Ghost" | John Banas | Boaz Stark | TBA |
Constance and her mother go to get their picture taken; when it is developed a strange shadowy figure has appeared in the background. The children begin hiding the mirror from Lily so she can no longer get through. Fergus has the idea to scan the photograph into his computer to try to determine who the mysterious figure is. Meanwhile, Gervaise is working in the house's cellar and strange things start to happen. The ghostly figure appears to Constance and writes to "Beware". The children discover that the ghost is Charles Jamieson, an Irishman who built Limerick House back in 1842. A local Māori woman tells the children that Charles died in the cellar of the house. The ghost was warning the children of a cave-in in the cellar, Constance rushes through the mirror, just in time to save her mother from being crushed in the cellar.
| 6 | 6 | "Chamber Pots" | John Banas | Margaret Wilson | TBA |
Mai Ling, the de Lutrelle's servant is dismissed as a thief; Constance is shocked and resolves to discover the real culprit. Daniel, Fergus and Constance realise the real thief is Aunt Lily and they go into town to find the things Lily had stolen from the de Lutrelle's. The de Lutrelle's discover that Mai Ling was not the real thief and she is offered her job back, she accepts, and discovers the secret of the mirror.
| 7 | 7 | "The Iceman" | John Banas | Boaz Stark | TBA |
In the present time, Daniel and Fergus discover a body in the glacier. One of the possessions on the body was a stud box that belonged to Gervaise de Lutrelle. They inform Constance of their find and she tries to stop her father from going to sell the box, because she believes the body that the boys found was that of her father. Gervaise goes anyway, and Constance follows him. Daniel, Mandy and Fergus rush after them on mountain bikes. While on his journey to sell the stud box, Gervaise is robbed, meaning that the man whole stole the box is the man that they found on the body in the glacier.
| 8 | 8 | "The Widow Graveney" | John Banas | Margaret Wilson | TBA |
With the influence of the children from 1997, Constance begins behaving more and more "unlady-like". Gervaise hires a widow, Mrs Graveney, to teach her to be more of a lady. Unbeknownst to Gervaise, Mrs Graveney was also the ringleader of a gang of orphan thieves. One of them, Spike, takes Mandy captive, and will not release her even after she tells him the secret about the mirror.
| 9 | 9 | "The Guests from Hell" | Sophia Scheding | Rick Maier | TBA |
Some guests arrive at Limerick house, the Rickenbackers. The family want everything their way and act as if they own the place. Constance is mistaken for a ghost and the children hatch a plan to rid themselves of the obnoxious Rickenbackers, but things backfire.
| 10 | 10 | "The Artist" | Sophia Scheding | Rick Maier | 22 April 1996 |
Lewis is a gold prospector, who hasn't had much luck. After trading his land claim, with Fergus for a pocket knife, he now has nothing and spends his time painting his life story on the walls of a sea cave. Fergus still gripped with gold fever tries to reason with Lewis and realises that some things are more important than gold. In 1997 the children visit an art gallery, and see a painting by Lewis Bast, the same Lewis from 1867. The painting is of an unknown girl, but the children notice that the girl is Constance.
| 11 | 11 | "Spike" | Sophia Scheding | Susan Bower | TBA |
Spike, the orphan from 1867, who took Mandy hostage, comes through the mirror. While living in an abandoned building, it catches fire and he finds himself accused of robbery and arson. Mandy is on his side though and Daniel tries to prove his innocence.
| 12 | 12 | "Seals" | John Banas | Susan Bower | TBA |
The children find out that in Constance's time they kill seals for their oil. They become angered by this because this is why there are none left in their time. The children try to persuade a seal trapper that what he is doing is wrong, and to stop what he is doing. Mandy finds a sick seal pup and decided the only way to save the pup is to take it through the mirror, but trouble ensues.
| 13 | 13 | "Foreigners" | John Banas | David Marsh | TBA |
Reverend Pinbody arrives with his family. The Reverend is a faith-healer who begins stirring up racial hatred towards the Chinese people. The children, along with Gervaise discover something interesting about one of the people who were magically healed by the Reverend, and set out to expose him for the charlatan he is.
| 14 | 14 | "Disco" | John Banas | David Marsh | TBA |
Constance decided that the 20th century is a far better time for women and she says she's not going back to her time. She later attends a disco with the other kids, and realises that there are some benefits to living in the 19th century.
| 15 | 15 | "Greenstone" | Sophia Scheding | Annette Moore | TBA |
Gervaise removes some sacred greenstone from the river, Constance fears he has broken a "tapu". The children attempt to frighten Gervaise to return the stone to the river, while Constance looks for the help of a Māori elder named Tamihana. They must persuade Gervaise to return the stone before disaster befalls them.
| 16 | 16 | "Mandy's Dog" | Sophia Scheding | Annette Moore | TBA |
Mandy is miserable because she thinks everyone has forgotten her birthday. She is surprised when the family put on a surprise party and produce her present a new pup. Meanwhile, Fergus is camped in a totara tree to stop the local farmer from chopping it down. Victor savages a sheep and the farmer resolves to shoot the dog and get rid of Fergus too.
| 17 | 17 | "Elephant Boy" | Sophia Scheding | Stephen Measday | TBA |
A travelling circus comes to the area. The circus' most popular attraction is a deformed "Elephant Boy". The children resolve to help him by bringing him through the mirror so that their doctors can perform plastic surgery on him. But their plan misfires. Modern medicine is not as infallible as they thought, and meanwhile James has lost the only family he ever knew. Constance tries to right their wrongs.
| 18 | 18 | "Meltdown" | John Banas | Stephen Measday | TBA |
Lily up to her old tricks again, comes up with the best idea to get rich. She takes inventions from 1997 through the mirror and passes them off as her own, and begins "inventing" things before their time. The mirror tries to change the entire history and starts behaving strangely. The children discover the cause and put things right, and Mandy helps an inventor discover his own invention: bubblegum.
| 19 | 19 | "Herons" | John Banas | Daniel Krige | TBA |
A party of tourists spot a hairy creature, dubbed the 'Jamieson Gully monster'; the media swoop down in droves. The boys set off of to track down the Yowie but when they do come upon it, they are terrified and flee to the house. The girls finally confront the monster.
| 20 | 20 | "The Shipwreck" | John Banas | Daniel Krige | TBA |
One night in 1867, a cargo ship runs aground near the goldfields. A young sailor named Jake is accused of negligence, his punishment is to be hanged. Constance believes Jake's story and so she and her friends set off to investigate the wreck. They discover something suspicious, and try to save Jake from his fate.
| 21 | 21 | "Bank Robbers" | Sophia Scheding | Katherine Thomson | TBA |
Lily tells the family she is leaving Limerick House. She really makes off with the mirror, in 1867; Ned Kelly steals Constance's. Ned places the mirror in a bank vault; and Lily aligns hers in the twentieth century. She then goes through the mirror to steal the money. It's a race against time for the children to retrieve the mirror and foil the greedy duo.
| 22 | 22 | "Tetanus" | Sophia Scheding | Katherine Thomson | TBA |
Constance sees Fergus and Daniel strip to their underwear to retrieve a ball they threw into the river. Embarrassed, she runs off and falls on some rusty barbed wire. She contracts tetanus. Back in her time, the vaccine for tetanus is not known, and there are no antibiotics. Meanwhile, back in the present the children discover a family connection between two doctors, one in the past and one in the present. Can the children use this to save their dying friend?
| 23 | 23 | "The Toddler" | Sophia Scheding | Tracey Trinder-Doig | TBA |
Fergus is upset when he can't find any baby pictures of him in the family album. He storms off to the attic and goes through the mirror. Mandy finds a picture of him as a baby, and puts it on the mirror for him to see. When Fergus comes back through the mirror it transforms him into the baby version of himself in the photograph. The children do not know what to do and send him back through where he is found by Violette. Constance tells the other that her mother found him and they try to get him back. They realise they must find a more recent picture of Fergus. They decide to use the picture which had been taken that morning. They return through the mirror and Fergus is restored to his teenage self, unaware of what had happened.
| 24 | 24 | "The River" | John Banas | Tracey Trinder-Doig | TBA |
Caroline returns to Limerick House and sees how well Daniel is getting on, she begins to feel jealous. Wanting to renew the bond she had with her son, they take part in a kayak expedition. But things go awry when she and Daniel take a wrong turn and end up in the rapids. Doug finds the empty kayak, and fears the worst.
| 25 | 25 | "Hall of Mirrors" | John Banas | Anthony Ellis | TBA |
In 1867, Aunt Lily unintentionally burns down the de Lutrelle's barn. Gervaise decides that he has to sell the crown to pay for the repairs. In 1997 Daniel and Fergus are arguing because Daniel has his real dad with him and Fergus doesn't. Fergus throws a baseball at Daniel, he ducks and goes through the mirror, at the same time Constance argues with her father not to sell the crown and grabbed it from his hands and races through the mirror. As Constance and Daniel are travelling through the mirror, the baseball hits it and it shatters into thousands of pieces. In the past Gervaise saw his daughter travel through the mirror and ducks from the shards of glass as they shoots from the frame. Daniel and Constance are still in Limerick House, but they are in a different dimension.
| 26 | 26 | "Daniel" | John Banas | Anthony Ellis | TBA |
Fergus and Mandy try to reassemble the broken pieces of the mirror. Fergus has the idea that if they put the pieces together on their side the mirror will repair itself on the other side. It works. While in the Hall of Mirrors, a kind woman appears to Daniel and Constance. She tells Constance she was right to steal the crown as the heir is dead. She also reveals that the crown can make a difference to the future. Meanwhile, in 1867 Gervais strikes gold, meaning he no longer has any need to sell the crown. The mirror appears and Constance goes through. Upon her return, Constance discovers that her father has entrusted the crown to her to do as she sees fit, but before she can arrange this with her friends in the 1990s, the mirror vanishes, signifying the end of their adventures. Back in 1997, Daniel, Fergus and Mandy visit Constance's grave and discover a clue to the location of the crown. Someone arrives and gives them a letter from Constance. The letter states that they are the new proprietors of the Crown Foundation. Now that their adventures had come to an end, Daniel decides to go back home and stay with this mum. In an epilogue, an old woman sits in the Hall of Mirrors, apparently waiting for someone. She is eventually joined by an old man, who greets her and expresses his joy that she waited, just as he hoped she would. In a flash of light, the old woman is revealed to be Constance and the old man Daniel. After her death, she waited in the Hall of Mirrors for Daniel, so that the two could advance to the afterlife together. With Daniel's own passing, the two were finally able to be together the way they could not be in life.
