= Caitlin Hill =

Australian blogger (born 1988)

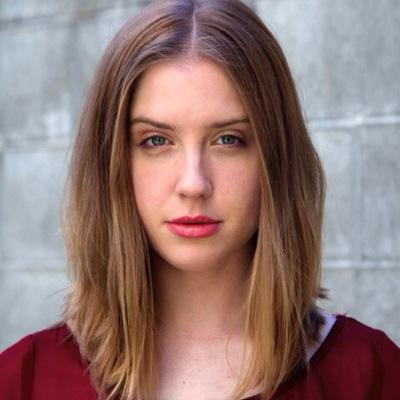
- Born: Caitlin Alexandra Hill; 8 September 1988 (age 38); Brisbane, Queensland, Australia
- Occupations: YouTube personality
- Years active: 2006–present
- Known for: Comedy, vlogging, lip sync

YouTube information
- Channel: S Facts
- Years active: 2006–present
- Genres: Lifestyle; comedy; vlogging; Q&A; skits
- Subscribers: 70.4 thousand
- Views: 42.4 million
- Last updated: 22 June 2026
- Website: starnow.com.au/actorcaitlinhill

Caitlin Alexandra Hill (born 8 September 1988) is an Australian YouTube personality under the name TheHill88. She produces, edits and uploads her videos from her home in Brisbane, and since 2008 from New York City.

Dubbed "the goofy princess of cyberspace" by Australia's version of 60 Minutes, Hill maintains a channel on YouTube. By November 2008, her videos had a cumulative view count of over 17 million.

In addition to maintaining a channel on YouTube, Hill is the Chief Creative Officer of Hitviews, a website and new media business venture, which she co-founded with Walter Sabo. The site allows marketers direct access to internet celebrities such as Kevin Nalty and Cory Williams. Bob Weinstein is among the site's investors.

== YouTube fame ==
Hill submitted her first video to YouTube 16 August 2006, as a fan response to popular web serial lonelygirl15. A day later, Hill began to assemble fans of her own upon uploading Re: LonelyGirl: Lazydork is Better Than You (posted 17 August 2006), a video response to YouTube comedian Richard Stern, received over 1,000,000 views before September 2006. Described by The Age as "cheesy rap", YouTube featured the video and her 14 short videos collectively received over 4,000,000 views.

She has credited Zach Braff, Brooke Brodack and Bree, a lonelygirl15 character played by Jessica Rose, for inspiring her to join the YouTube community.

After sustaining a sizable viewership on YouTube for nearly a year, Hill became one of the first twenty to thirty YouTube users to join the YouTube partnership program in May 2007. This status gives the user "the ability to share in ad revenue".

In September 2007, Hill announced on her MySpace blog that 2007 would be her last year in the partnership program, stating:

I'll try really hard to make 2007 my last year of YouTube. Sure I'll keep TheHill88 up, but I wont force myself to make videos. I'll only ever do them when I want to and ONLY when I have a really good idea. So I suppose it's not my last year...but its my last committed year. I'll have to end the partnership and everything....for now, I need to focus all my attention on the REAL WORLD and my goals.

By October 2007, YouTube no longer listed Hill as a revenue sharing partner.

In addition to her own output, Hill plays a recurring role in Choose Your Own Tube, a YouTube serial produced and directed by Remi Broadway.

In July 2007, she featured in 'Disgrace', a music-video created by the band Coldstone.

Also in July 2007, Hill played herself in Lisa Donovan's comedy sketch LisaNova Does YouTube, in which she and other popular video bloggers are kidnapped by Donovan and made to comment on thousands of YouTube user profiles.

In August 2018, Caitlin made a return to YouTube and relaunched her channel with the series "Snacks and Facts with Caitlin Hill".

== Off YouTube ==
Hill played an unpaid but central part in the independent horror movie The Girl in the Red Dress, featuring Remi Broadway, among others.

She plied her YouTube fame to The Darfur Wall, earning the nonprofit website hundreds of hits in a period of two weeks. Her fansite ranked at #2 in advocacy points.

In February 2007, Hill visited California to take part in the "As One" YouTube gathering in San Francisco. She appeared on Tom Green Live with "Weird Al" Yankovic and Mike Vallely during her stay.

Over the course of repeated travels from Australia to the United States, Hill has auditioned for roles in several big-budget Hollywood movies.

Hill was cast for the role of Lucy Grimm in the remake of Plan 9 from Outer Space, whose teaser trailer was released on 9 September 2009 to coincide with the 50th anniversary of the original, but pulled out.

In 2008, Caitlin Hill announced in multiple videos that she moved to New York City, New York.

On 8 December 2008, Hill became the youngest recipient of the National Arts Club Medal of Honor.

On 20 April 2009, Hill briefly became the new host of the vlog Rocketboom, replacing the outgoing Joanne Colan. However, Rocketboom producer Andrew Baron stated that they were unable to reach agreement with Hitviews to keep Hill at that time, although they hoped to reach a deal. Molly Templeton subsequently replaced Hill on Rocketboom.

Hill performed with a Brisbane Bollywood Performance Team, Dance Masala.

== See also ==
- YouTube celebrities
- Vegemite wars
