= LCH (clearing house) =

British clearing house group

LCH Group
- Type: Private
- Industry: Financial
- Founded: 1888; 138 years ago
- Headquarters: London, England, UK
- Products: Clearing house
- Owner: London Stock Exchange Group (82.61%)
- Website: www.lch.com

LCH (originally London Clearing House) is a financial market infrastructure company headquartered in London that provides clearing services to major international exchanges and to a range of OTC markets. The LCH Group includes two main entities: LCH Limited based in London and LCH SA based in Paris (formally Banque Centrale de Compensation SA, also known from 1999 to 2003 as Clearnet then until 2016 as LCH.Clearnet).

As of 2012, LCH cleared approximately 50% of the global interest rate swap market, and was the second largest clearer of bonds and repos in the world, providing services across 13 government debt markets. In addition, LCH clears a broad range of asset classes including: commodities, securities, exchange traded derivatives, credit default swaps, energy contracts, freight derivatives, interest rate swaps, foreign exchange and Euro and Sterling denominated bonds and repos.

LCH's members comprise many of the major global financial institutions including almost all of the major investment banks, broker dealers and international commodity houses. LCH, being a clearing house, sits in the middle of a trade – assuming the counterparty risk involved when two parties trade and guaranteeing the settlement of the trade. To mitigate the risks involved it imposes certain minimum requirements on its members and collects initial and variation margin (or collateral) from them for trades that have been executed.

== History ==
LCH traces its roots back to the London Produce Clearing House, established in 1888, and the Paris-based Clearnet, established in 1969. Both developed from clearing commodity transactions. They merged in 2003 to form LCH.Clearnet. In 2013, the London Stock Exchange Group acquired a majority stake in the business. In 2016 LCH.Clearnet dropped Clearnet from its branding name.

=== London Clearing House ===
- 1888 – The London Produce Clearing House (LPCH) is established to clear commodities contracts in London. Shares are in public ownership and the company is listed on the London Stock Exchange.
- 1951 – LPCH is wholly acquired by United Dominions Trust.
- 1971 – The company is renamed the International Commodities Clearing House (ICCH).
- 1980 – Ownership passes to a consortium of six British banks.
- 1992 – ICCH divests the clearing software business to Sungard and is renamed the London Clearing House Ltd (LCH).
- 1996 – Majority ownership of LCH transfers to the whole clearing membership, with the LME, IPE and LIFFE acquiring minority ownership.
- 2003 – LCH.Clearnet Group is formed following the merger of the London Clearing House and Clearnet SA.

=== Clearnet ===
- 1969 – Banque Centrale de Compensation SA is established to clear contracts traded in Paris commodity markets.
- 1990 – Banque Centrale de Compensation SA becomes a subsidiary of MATIF, and is the first organisation in Europe to clear both cash and derivatives.
- 1998 – Bourse de Paris takes control of MATIF. It launches a clearing service for French government securities and is the first organisation in Europe to permit remote clearing.
- 1999 – Banque Centrale de Compensation consolidates all clearing operations of Paris Bourse SA (previously Société des Bourses Francaises – Bourse de Paris) and MATIF SA and adopts the commercial brand Clearnet SA, while remaining legally registered under its former name. Clearnet thus becomes the clearing house for all products traded in the Paris markets.
- 2000 – Euronext is established through the merger of Paris Bourse, the Amsterdam Exchanges and the Brussels Exchanges.
- 2001 – Clearnet merges with Euronext Amsterdam's and Euronext Brussels' Clearing Houses.
- 2003 – Euronext Lisbon contributes its derivative and OTC equity clearing businesses to Clearnet which thus acquires a branch in Portugal to establish a local presence with Portuguese clearing members.
- 2003 – LCH.Clearnet Group is formed following the merger of the London Clearing House and Clearnet SA.

=== Post merger ===
- 2003 – LCH.Clearnet Group is formed following the merger of the London Clearing House and Clearnet SA. New ownership comprises: Clearing Members 45.1%, Exchanges 45.1%, Euroclear 9.8%.
- 2007 – LCH.Clearnet and Euronext announce repurchase by LCH.Clearnet of shares held by Euronext to more closely align customer and shareholder interests. Revised ownership comprises: Clearing Members 73.3%, Exchanges 10.9%, Euroclear 15.8%.
- 2008 – LCH.Clearnet successfully resolves $9 trillion of Lehman Brothers OTC interest rate swap defaults.
- 2009 – US office opened.
- 2009 – Dormant shareholders are retired and shareholders are given the option to reduce or exit their holdings. Revised ownership comprises: Clearing members 82.85%, Exchanges 17.15%.
- 2012 – The London Stock Exchange gets enough support to acquiring a 60% stake in LCH.Clearnet with an offer of €19 per share, giving LCH.Clearnet a valuation of €813 million (£677 million/ $1.1 billion).
- 2012 – LCH.Clearnet acquired sole ownership of International Derivatives Clearing Group, LLC from the NASDAQ OMX Group, Inc. and certain other investors. IDCG became a U.S. subsidiary of LCH.Clearnet, reinforcing LCH.Clearnet's presence in the U.S. marketplace, where it already operated IRS clearing through its SwapClear service.
- 2013 – London Stock Exchange Group acquired a majority stake in the business.
- 2016 – LCH.Clearnet drops "Clearnet" from its name. It will be called LCH henceforth.

== Products ==
LCH provides clearing or central counterparty services in the following markets:

=== Commodities ===
LCH provides clearing and settlement services for both the exchange-traded and the OTC commodity markets. LCH clears commodities including non-ferrous metals (100 million metal trades are cleared annually), plastics and steel which are exchange traded on the London Metal Exchange, as well as a broad range of futures and options contracts covering soft and agricultural products. It also clears over-the-counter products including gold, coal, steel and iron ore and fertilizer swaps.

=== Credit default swaps ===
The international CDSClear service provides full straight-through processing (STP) multilateral clearing, reduced counterparty risk and post-trade anonymity and encompasses the core requirements as determined by key industry and policy groups, including ISDA, CESR, the ECB and the European Commission.

=== Derivatives ===
LCH is the largest a user-owned and user-governed global supplier of clearing services to the derivatives markets. This is either directly to the user community or by operating the clearing process on behalf of a third party via an insourcing arrangement, providing services to clients for Short Term Interest Rates (STIRs), Indexes and Equity derivatives. This includes credit derivatives.

==== Energy ====
LCH provides clearing services to clients for OTC Emissions trading and the US electricity trading on the Nodal Exchange (the first independent electronic commodities exchange offering locational forward trading products and services to participants in the organised North American power markets). LCH also provided services for Bluenext Futures EUA and Bluenext Futures CER, and today future contracts on EU Allowances and on Certified Emission Reductions.

==== Equities ====
EquityClear, LCH's equity clearing service, offers clearing for equities and equity equivalents such as exchange traded funds (ETFs), exchange traded commodities (ETCs), real estate investment trusts (REITS) and exchange traded bonds. LCH clears equity-based trades that are executed on the London Stock Exchange (LSE), SIX Swiss Exchange, BATS Chi-X Europe, NYSE Euronext, Bourse de Luxembourg and Equiduct.

==== Centrally cleared CFDs ====
LCH runs a clearing service for contracts for difference (CFDs). CFDs were first launched in the UK in the early 90s as a short access product. Since then their use has grown across the world.

LCH's centrally cleared CFD (ccCFD) service, in conjunction with Chi-X Europe, are an alternative to the traditionally over-the-counter traded CFDs.

==== Fixed income ====
LCH provides clearing services covering French, Italian and Spanish government debts, on cash and repo transactions traded by financial institutions including Euro-MTS, MTS-France, MTS Italy, ICAP (BrokerTec) and Tullett Prebon, and trade providers such as the Euroclear Trade Capture and Matching System (Euroclear's matching system), and Viel/Tradition.

LCH's RepoClear service was established in partnership with leading banks in 1999, for some 13 European government repo and cash bond markets, and a range of pan-European €GC Baskets. As of 2012, monthly volumes averaged c. €13 trillion, and RepoClear clears cash bond and repo trades in the following markets: Austrian, Belgian, Dutch, German, Irish, Finnish, Portuguese, Slovak, Slovenian, Spanish and UK government bonds. Additional markets served include: German Jumbo Pfandbriefe and Supranationals, Agency and Sovereign. There are €12 trillion repo trades per month (based on nominal value) cleared through LCH.

==== Freight ====
LCH provides a clearing service for the registration of OTC Forward Freight Agreements (FFAs) for the most actively traded routes; thirteen dry and ten wet routes, as well as options on the four dry timecharter routes: Capesize, Panamax, Supramax and Handysize.

===== Container freight =====
LCH, as a member of the Container Freight Derivatives Association, launched a clearing service for the containerised freight market. The service provides an independent clearing service for the registration of OTC Container Freight Swap Agreements (CFSAs) for four of the most actively traded routes out of Shanghai.

==== Interest rate swaps ====
SwapClear is a global clearing service for OTC interest rate swaps, and as of 2010, cleared more than 50% of the global notional market. Launched in 1999, SwapClear initially cleared plain vanilla interest rate swaps in four major currencies. It moved on to clear swaps in 17 currencies; USD, EUR, and GBP out to 50 years, AUD, CAD, CHF, SEK and vanilla JPY out to 30 years and the remaining nine currencies out to ten years. It also clears overnight indexed swaps out to 2 years in USD, EUR, GBP and CHF.

In September 2008, LCH successfully managed Lehman Brothers’ US $9 trillion interest rate swap default, comprising over 66,000 trades, by implementing SwapClear's default management process. The default was fully resolved well within the margin held and at no loss to other market participants.

==== Foreign exchange ====
ForexClear covers the most actively traded currencies in the NDF marketplace.

== Regulation ==
LCH is regulated or overseen by the national securities regulator and/or central bank in each jurisdiction from which it operates.

1. Regulated as a Compagnie financière by the Autorité de Contrôle Prudentiel et de Résolution (France).
2. Regulated as a Derivatives Clearing Organization by the US Commodity Futures Trading Commission.
3. Regulated as a Recognised Clearing House by the UK Financial Conduct Authority (FCA). Payment systems are overseen by the Bank of England.
4. Regulated as a Credit Institution and Clearing House by a regulatory college consisting of the market regulators and central banks from the jurisdictions of: France, the Netherlands, Belgium and Portugal.
5. Regulated as a Recognised Overseas Clearing House by the UK Financial Conduct Authority.

== See also ==
- Central securities depository
- Stock exchange
- Derivatives exchange
- Bankers' clearing house
