= Remi Broadway =

Australian actor

- Born: 30 April 1978 (age 47); Australia
- Occupation: Actor/Entrepreneur

Remi Broadway (born 30 April 1978) is an Australian actor best known as Rupert Pringle from The Wayne Manifesto, and Piffy the bell ringer from The Late Show, which parodied his earlier appearance on the talent show Pot Luck.

== Biography ==
Broadway is the son of former juggler Johnny Broadway and French-born actress and TV presenter Christine Broadway.

Broadway hosted an Australian children's television show, Prime Possum Show on the Prime Television Network. After appearing in about 550 episodes, before leaving in 1996 to pursue a Hollywood career.

Broadway also appeared in the cult movie Rapid Fear along with Peter Kent and Vanja Matula. He produced and directed Choose Your Own Tube, a serial on YouTube featuring Caitlin Hill and his brother Regis Broadway.

In July 2011, Broadway opened Central, a lounge and dining bar in Surfers Paradise on the Gold Coast in Queensland, Australia.

== Filmography ==
Year	Title	Role	Notes
2002	Scooby-Doo	Training Video Guy #2	
2003	Swimming Upstream	Murray Rose	
2003	Inspector Gadget 2	Frozen Townsman	
2004	Rapid Fear	Callum Kennedy	
2006	Convictions	Des Carter	
2006	The Marine	Marine #1	
2007	Hypochondriac	Embry	
2009	Malibu Shark Attack	Doug	TV movie
2011	Enter the Hamster	Newsreader	
