= Imarex =

International Maritime Exchange
- Type: Futures exchange
- Location: Oslo, Norway
- Founded: 2001
- Owner: Imarex ASA
- Website: www.exchange.imarex.com

The International Maritime Exchange or Imarex is an Oslo-based exchange for trading forward freight agreements (FFAs). It started trading tanker freight futures contracts in 2001, followed by dry cargo freight futures contracts in 2002. All futures contracts are cleared by the Norwegian Futures and Options Clearing House (NOS). Imarex is owned by Imarex ASA (formerly known as Imarex NOS) and has subsidiaries in Oslo, Singapore, Genova and Houston (USA).
