= Imarex ASA =

- Company type: Public (OSE: Imarex)
- Industry: Finance
- Founded: 2006
- Headquarters: Oslo, Norway
- Area served: Global
- Website: www.imarex.com

Imarex ASA also known as the Imarex Group is a Norwegian company that operates a number of services related to shipping management including the futures exchange International Maritime Exchange (Imarex), the Norwegian Futures and Options Clearing House (NOS) and the commodity exchange Fish Pool. The group was created in 2006 when Imarex and NOS merged, under the name Imarex NOS. In 2007 the group changed its name to Imarex ASA. The primary owners are Frontline (15%) and DnB NOR (14%). The group also provides brokerage services within the carbon emission trade and energy trade.
