= Zvi Schreiber =

British-Israeli executive, and author (born 1969)

- צבי שרייבר
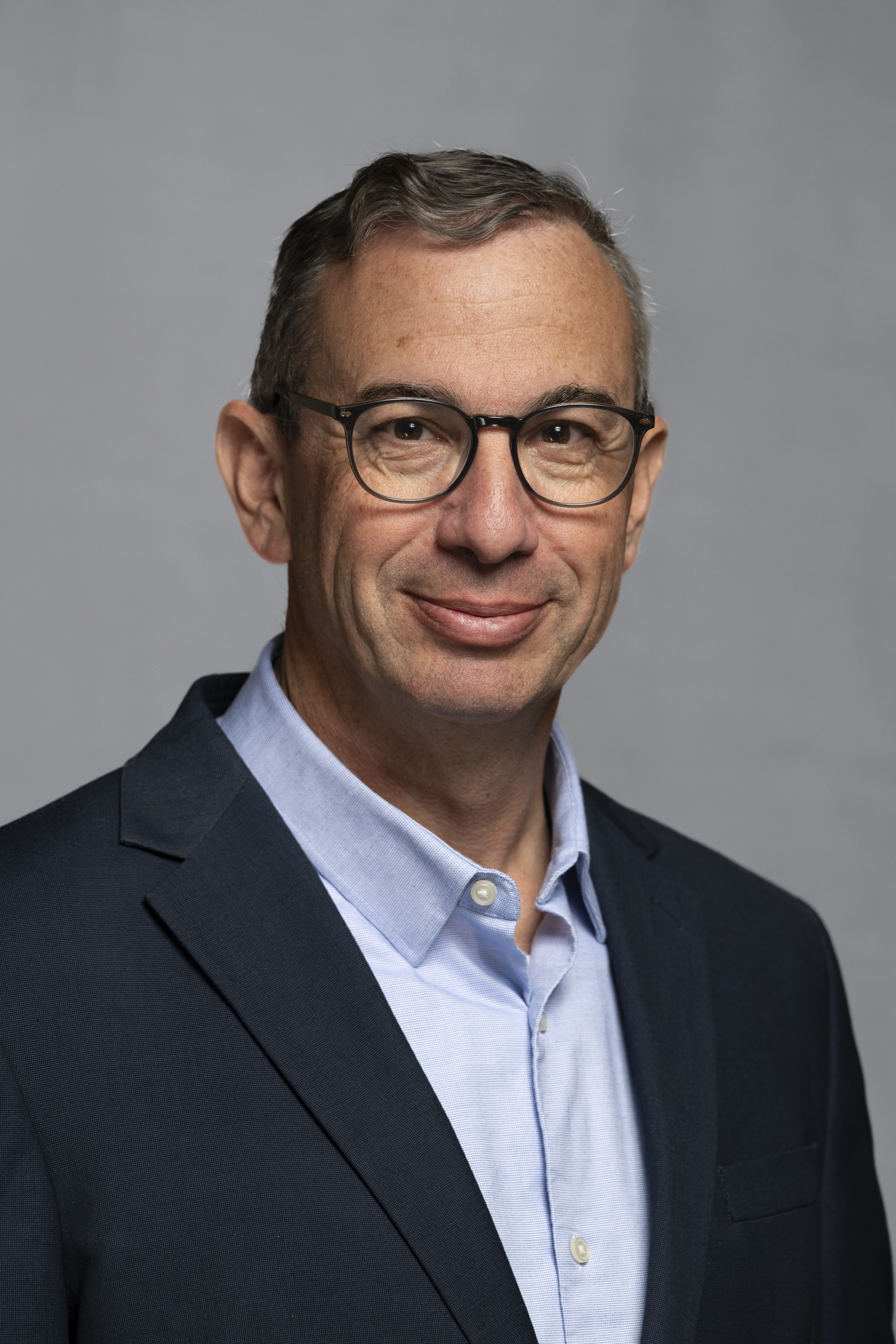

Personal details
- Born: 9 June 1969 (age 57) London, England
- Spouse: Rina Frei Schreiber

Zvi Schreiber (/ˈtsviː/, Hebrew: צבי שרייבר; born 9 June 1969) is a British-Israeli businessman, executive, and author. He founded high-tech startups like Freightos, and G.ho.st, which at the time was considered the only high-tech startup with a joint Palestinian–Israeli team. In 2011 Schreiber was CEO of Lightech which he sold to GE Lighting.

== Biography ==
Zvi Schreiber has a BA in Mathematics from the University of Cambridge, an MSc in Theoretical Physics (Quantum Fields) from Imperial College London, and a PhD in Computer Science from Imperial College London. He is the brother of Daniel Schreiber, CEO and co-founder of Lemonade. Schreiber also studied at Yeshivat Har Etzion.

== Freightos ==
Schreiber is Founder and former CEO of startup logistics technology company Freightos (Nasdaq:CRGO), a digital booking platform for international air and ocean freight that he describes as the "equivalent of Booking.com for the shipment of goods rather than people". Under Schreiber's leadership Freightos also acquired WebCargo which is a booking platform for freight forwarders, airlines and ocean liners, and launched the daily Freightos Baltic Index (FBX) of containerized shipping prices..

In December 2025, Schreiber and the Company announced his departure as CEO; he subsequently announced his resignation from the company's board of directors on 23 February 2026 on the day the Company announced its 2026 guidance and strategy. On 29 June 2026, he filed a Schedule 13D reporting beneficial ownership of approximately 6.1% of Freightos' outstanding shares and his plan to become an activist shareholder. Subsequently in September 2026 Schreiber launched a shareholder advocacy campaign at GrowCRGO.com calling to remove the board's chairman, and for the Company's return to a platform-first growth strategy.

== Earlier business career ==
In 2011 Schreiber was CEO of Lightech Electronic Industries Ltd, based in Israel, where he had served as a director since 1996. His father David Schreiber, an experienced businessman and investor, chaired the board. Lightech was acquired by GE Lighting at the end of 2011, during Schreiber's tenure.

Schreiber founded the following companies:

- IsraTec Limited
- Tradeum Inc, acquired by VerticalNet
- Unicorn Inc, acquired by IBM
- Ghost Inc (which traded as G.ho.st and has now closed operations).
- Freightos Limited

Schreiber has been invited to speak at software industry events and economic conferences.

He is a co-inventor of several patents and patent applications. He is the author of a paper presenting a Distributed Ledger Technology (Blockchain) algorithm named k-root-n.

== Published works ==
- Money, Going out of style, a book which explains the fundamentals of money and explores modern issues of inequality and money printing without inflation.
- Bad Hair Day, a small picture book with his own photography
- Fizz: Nothing is as it seems, which tells the story of the history of physics through a novel about a troubled young girl who time travels to meet Galileo, Newton, Einstein, and others, in the genre of Sophie's World.
