= Freightos =

Logistics software company headquartered in Barcelona

Freightos Ltd
- Type: Public
- Traded as: Nasdaq: CRGO
- ISIN: KYG514051013
- Industry: Logistics
- Founded: January 1, 2012; 14 years ago
- Founder: Dr. Zvi Schreiber
- Headquarters: Barcelona, Spain
- Number of locations: Barcelona, Modi'in, Ramallah, Oregon City, Montréal, Chennai, Champlain, Luxembourg. Incorporation: Cayman Islands
- Area served: Worldwide
- Products: WebCargo Rate & Quote software for freight forwarders, WebCargo Sales Portal, Freightos and Freightos Enterprise for importers and exporters, Freightos Terminal data, WebCargo distribution for carriers
- Services: Digital booking and payments platforms: WebCargo, freightos.com
- Revenue: $26 million
- Number of employees: 400
- Website: www.freightos.com

Freightos is a software company that operates a booking and payments platform for international freight, using a Software as a Service (SaaS)-Enabled Marketplace model. The platform, which connects airlines, ocean liners, trucking carriers, freight forwarders, and importers or exporters, facilitates transactions at a run-rate of 1.4 million per year connecting 77 air and ocean carriers with thousands of freight forwarders and importers/exporters.

It also provides rate management and quoting software for freight forwarders and carriers through WebCargo by Freightos, a subsidiary acquired in 2016.

The company provides a range of services for importers and exporters, including global freight market intelligence solutions such as the Freightos Baltic Index, freight procurement solutions via Shipsta, which was acquired in 2024, and the freightos.com freight marketplace which enables instant freight quoting, booking, and shipment management. The platform is also used by partners, like Alibaba.com.

The company went public on Nasdaq with ticker symbol CRGO January 2023 by combining with the SPAC Gesher 1. The company is registered in Cayman Islands and its largest office is Barcelona.

== History ==
Freightos was founded in January 2012 by Zvi Schreiber. Schreiber previously founded and managed other start-up companies, including some acquired by IBM and GE. The first beta customers of Freightos went live in October 2012 and the SaaS service was commercially launched in March 2013. Freightos raised initial funding from OurCrowd. Freightos is the trading name of Freightos Limited a Cayman Islands company (previously named Tradeos Limited, a Hong Kong company).

Freightos has been a member of the Airforwarders Association since January 2013 and the International Air Cargo Association since 2021. It is a member in other associations, such as TIACA, the AEMCA and others via its subsidiaries.

In August 2016, Freightos bought Spanish startup WebCargoNet, which later was marketed at WebCargo by Freightos. A similar, India-based air cargo rate management product, Air Freight Bazaar, was acquired by the company in 2019.

In March 2017, Freightos raised $25 million in Series B funding led by GE Ventures bringing the company's total funding to $50 million.

In April 2018, Freightos launched a daily containerized index, called the Freightos Baltic Exchange Index. This is widely used as an indicator of global container prices. In 2021 Freightos launched the Freightos Air Index (FAX) of air cargo rates.

In September 2018, Freightos announced a $44.4 million Series C funding round, led by the Singapore Exchange and together with previous investors, including Aleph and More VC. During the interview, Freightos founder Zvi Schreiber also mentioned the company's aspirations to connect carriers, like airlines, directly to forwarders and shippers.

In January 2021, Freightos announced the acquisition of 7LFreight, an air and trucking rate management software solution with a core customer base in the United States.

In August 2024, Freightos also announced the acquisition of Shipsta, an enterprise-grade tender procurement solution used by multinational importers and exporters.

In December 2025, Schreiber announced that he would step down as CEO “in order to pursue other entrepreneurial interests” but said that he would remain on the board as a non-executive director. In February 2026, Schreiber announced that he would leave the board of directors.

== freightos.com overview ==
On July 26, 2016, Freightos launched one of the world's first online marketplaces for international freight, providing instant comparison, booking, and management of freight services from multiple logistics providers. Over time, a number of partnerships related to this endeavor were announced, including direct booking with CMA CGM, a top-five ocean liner.

== WebCargo overview ==
WebCargo provides rate management including features for uploading freight pricing contracts in Excel, a database for freight rates, and a module for automatic freight and quotations on the Web. The quotation algorithm includes routing of door-to-door freight services. This supports exchanging quote requests and quotes between freight forwarders and their agents. WebCargo also offers white-labeled online sales portal solutions for forwarders.

Since 2018, cargo airlines began to offer connectivity for air cargo pricing and booking. During these years WebCargo augmented its business model to also function as a booking platform, and the company claims to be the largest platform with which freight forwarders digitally book air cargo services with airlines. In July 2018, Lufthansa became the first airline to offer direct rates for forwarders on the platform. This was followed by additional airlines, including Air France–KLM in April 2019, IAG Cargo (British Airways and Iberia) in July 2019, SAS Cargo in November 2019, Etihad in February 2020, AirBridgeCargo in June 2020, Qatar Airways in January 2021, TAP Air Portugal Cargo in January 2021. By 2024, carriers on the platform represented some 70% of global cargo capacity, although not all of that capacity is available for digital booking.

The company continues to report on additional carriers, reaching 55 digitized carriers actively receiving bookings in Q3 2024. Across its entire platform, the company reached 339.1 thousand transactions in Q3 2024, growing 26% compared to Q3 2023.

== See also ==
- Freight broker
- Freight rate
- Freight transport
