= Fiz =

Fiz or FIZ may refer to:

- Fiz Brown, a character on Coronation Street
- FIZ Karlsruhe, a German research institute
- BMW FIZ, a German research lab
- Fitzroy Crossing Airport, IATA airport code "FIZ", in Western Australia
- Martín Fiz (born 1963), Spanish athlete
- Free Industrial Zone, a type of free-trade zone

== See also ==
- Fizz (disambiguation)
