= Simon Porritt =

Ex-CEO of SIMJEN and former actor

- Known for: founder and former CEO of SIMJEN

Simon James Porritt (born 1981 in Adelaide, Australia) is a founder and former CEO of SIMJEN, an Australian marketing company based in Brisbane, Queensland, that was put into liquidation on 27 March 2013. He has also appeared as an actor under the name Simon James.

== Acting career ==
As Simon James, Porritt began working in local Australian television series, including The New Adventures of Skippy (1990), The Wayne Manifesto (1996-1997) and Mirror Mirror II (1998).

== SIMJEN ==
In 2009, Simon Porritt founded SIMJEN, a creative business marketing and development company in Brisbane, Queensland, Australia

In 2011, Porritt converted an early Brisbane power station into office space to host SIMJEN Headquarters. In the same year, SIMJEN began sponsoring a Porsche 911 GT3 in the Australian Carrera Cup Championship, with New Zealander Jonny Reid as its driver.

The sponsorship of the team was cancelled in 2012 and this caused Alex Davison's attempt on the 2012 Porsche City Index Carrera Cup "a serious blow after it parted ways with Simon Porrit".

SIMJEN was put into voluntary liquidation as of 27 March 2013. Previously, in 2011, SIMJEN was awarded the BRW Fast Starter as one of Australia's 100 new fastest-growing companies with more than 100 staff and in 2012, Simon Porrit was interviewed by the Financial Review's BRW Magazine.

== Controversy ==
Simon Porritt's company, SIMJEN, gathered a lot of controversy within the Internet industry and was considered by many as an 'unscrupulous internet enterprise'. Previous members of staff, customers and internet commentators have created a popular internet forum where they express their grievances about SIMJEN and Simon Porrit online.

According to sources, SIMJEN had neglected to inform customers of their impending liquidation and removed all hosting accounts, leaving thousands of SIMJEN's customers in the lurch.

On 29 November 2013, A Current Affair aired a story of customers claiming to have been conned by Mr Porritt.
