= The Wayne Manifesto =

- Genre: Children; Comedy; Family
- Written by: David McRobbie
- Directed by: Paul Maloney; Sophie Turkiewicz; Ian Watson; Denny Lawrence; David Cameron; Steve Mann
- Starring: Jeffrey Walker; Simon James; Remi Broadway; Brooke Harman; Cassandra Magrath
- Country of origin: Australia
- Original language: English
- No. of seasons: 1
- No. of episodes: 26

Production
- Executive producer: Peter Jackson
- Producer: Alan Hardy
- Production locations: Brisbane, Queensland
- Editor: Simon James
- Running time: 25 minutes
- Production company: Burberry Productions

Original release
- Network: ABC
- Release: 2 June – 7 July 1997

The Wayne Manifesto is an Australian children's television series that aired on the ABC. Based on the children's books by David McRobbie, it is centred on the life of 12-year-old Wayne Wilson, showing the world both as the way he would like it and the way it really is. Filmed in Brisbane, Australia, it aired weekdays at 5pm on the ABC in 1997 and re-runs at 4.30pm in 1999. It has also aired on the BBC in the UK and was broadcast from 1998 to 2005.

== Cast ==
- Jeffrey Walker as Wayne Wilson
- Simon James as Keven Mary
- Remi Broadway as Rupert
- Brooke Harman as Rosie
- Cassandra Magrath as Charlene
- Jah'shua McAvoy as Squocka
- Korey Fernando as James
- Tracey-Louise Smith as Violet
- Ingrid Mason as Mrs. Pringle
- Rainee Skinner as Wayne's Mum
- Reg Gorman as Grandpa
- Nick Waters as Dad
- Sally McKenzie as Ms Cunningham
- Sam Atwell
- John Batchelor as Mr Scudamore
- Kim Krejus as Aunt Irene

== Episodes ==
1. A Wayne in a Manger
2. The Alien
3. This Guy Dellafield
4. A Slave to Fashion
5. Pizza
6. Rites and Wrongs
7. The Wayne Manifesto
8. There's Good in Everybody
9. Harris Weed
10. You Can't Take Him Anywhere
11. Junk
12. Work Experience
13. Wise Words
14. Now You See It, Now You Still See It
15. Fancy Dress
16. Wheels Within Wheels
17. Special Operations
18. Elementary, My Dear Squocka
19. Soap
20. Amy Pastrami Day
21. Witch Wayne
22. A Wayne's Gotta Do...
23. The Harder They Fall
24. Where's Wilson
25. Dad's Ad
26. Wayne in the Wings

== Merchandise ==
Village Roadshow released the following VHS tapes in 1997 containing two episodes each:

- The Alien
- This Guy Dellafield

== Awards ==
- It won 1996 AFI Award for Best Children's Television Drama.
- An ATOM (Australian Teachers of Media) Award for Best Children's Drama series.
- David McRobbie won an AWGIE (Australian Writer's Guild) Award for 3 episodes.
