= G.ho.st =

- Developer: Ghost Inc.
- Type: Web application
- Website: ghost.cc

Ghost Inc.
- Type: Private
- Founded: 2006
- Defunct: 2010
- Headquarters: Ramallah, Palestine and Jerusalem, Israel
- Key people: Zvi Schreiber, CEO
- Website: ghost.cc

G.ho.st (usually pronounced ghost) was the trading name of Ghost Inc. and the service name and URL of the company's hosted computer operating system or web desktop service. Its name is an acronym of Global Hosted Operating SysTem. The old URL G.ho.st was a domain hack (using the São Tomé and Príncipe .st country extension). In April 2010 Ghost closed its service due to competition and lack of funding.

== Overview ==
The G.ho.st service provided a web-based working environment that mimicked the classic desktop provided by personal computer operating systems. Users were able to create, save and return to a working environment from different physical computers and mobile phones. G.ho.st called itself a virtual computer. Such services are not considered operating systems in the traditional sense although they are sometimes referred to as Web Operating Systems. Whilst they can include a GUI (e.g. a desktop), a (virtual) file system, application management and security, they do not contain a kernel to interface with physical hardware. Therefore, to use the service an operating system is required, supporting at least a web browser from which the service can be run.

In July 2009 the software entered beta stage development, and remained in this stage. The beta launch near Jerusalem was attended by Quartet Representative and former UK prime minister Tony Blair. The Company's primary investor was Benchmark Capital.

G.ho.st was hosted on Amazon Web Services, utilizing cloud computing on the backend and delivering a consumer version of cloud computing. According to the G.ho.st website (which is no longer accessible), it was planned to additionally offer a commercial, fully featured and scalable private cloud file system (Ghost Cloud File System, CFS) that would have run within the customer's own Amazon web services account. The business model would have been based on surcharges to Ghost, collected by Amazon.

The company received growing press coverage, relating both to the technology and because Israelis and Palestinians worked as partners to build the company's products. At its time it was considered to be the only joint Palestinian and Israeli technology startup company and the first company to offer employee stock options in the Palestinian Territories.

== Closure ==
On March 3, 2010, Ghost.cc (which replaced the previous URL G.ho.st) sent the users the following e-mail:

Dear Ghost User, We hope you have been enjoying our free Ghost service. Regrettably changes in the marketplace mean that it is no longer economical for us to host the Ghost service and we will be closing down the service on or around March 15. We will instead be focusing on licensing or selling our technology to larger companies. We advise you to migrate ALL important folders, files and emails to another secure place before March 15. You might like to consider Google Docs or Microsoft SkyDrive for files and services such as Gmail or Yahoo! Mail for email. Some instructions for migrating data are included below. We are really sorry for any inconvenience this may cause you and are very grateful for the fantastic support we had from our community.

== Features ==
- Integration with third-party web applications (Google Docs, ThinkFree, Meebo, Zoho)
- Mail/calendar/contacts program (with 10 GB free powered by Zimbra)
- Storage called My G.ho.st Drive (15 GB free, FTP access)
- Smart icons and tags for external internet resources such as files, products and people (Tagging Things)
- Desktop widgets (RSS Reader, Calculator, clock, Yahoo Weather, Stickies, Google Search)
- Multiple language support
- Virtual File System shows files stored by G.ho.st Drive, Google Docs and others with a consistent explorer
- G.ho.st Sync – an installed application which synchronizes files between the local computer and G.ho.st Drive
- File sharing

== See also ==
Similar services:

- Web desktop
- Web portal
