= Shipping markets =

The international shipping industry can be divided into four closely related shipping markets, each trading in a different commodity: the freight market, the sale and purchase market, the newbuilding market and the demolition market. These four markets are linked by cash flow and push the market traders in the direction they want.

== The freight market ==
The freight market consists of shipowners, charterers and brokers. They use four types of contractual arrangements: the voyage charter, the contract of affreightment, the time charter and the bareboat charter. Shipowners contract to carry cargo for an agreed price per tonne while the charter market hires out ships for a certain period. A charter is legally agreed upon in a charter-party in which the terms of the deal are clearly set out.

=== Freight derivatives ===
Freight derivatives, which include forward freight agreements (FFA), container freight swap agreements, container freight derivatives, physical-deliverable freight derivatives, and options based on these, are financial instruments for trading in future levels of freight rates for dry bulk carriers, tankers and containerships. These instruments are settled against various freight rate indices published by the Baltic Exchange (for Dry and most Wet contracts), Shanghai Shipping Exchange (International and domestic Dry Bulk, and International Containers), and Platt's (Asian Wet contracts), or physical delivered through Shanghai Shipping Freight Exchange.

FFAs are often traded through broker members of the Forward Freight Agreement Brokers Association (FFABA), such as Arrow Futures, Clarkson's Securities, Marex Spectron, SSY - Simpson Spence & Young, Braemar Seascope LTD, Freight Investor Services, BGC Partners, GFI Group, ACM Shipping Ltd, BRS, Tradition-Platou and ICAP. Trades can be given up for clearing by the broker to one of the clearing houses that support such trades, or be executed in integrated electronic exchange. There are five clearing houses for freight: NOS Clearing/NASDAQ OMX, EEX, CME Clearport, ICE Futures Europe and SGX, and one electronic exchange: Shanghai Shipping Freight Exchange. Freight derivatives are primarily used by shipowners and operators, oil companies, trading companies, and grain houses as tools for managing freight rate risk. Recently, with commodities standing at the forefront of international economics, the large financial trading houses, including banks and hedge funds, have entered the market.

Baltic Dry Index measures the cost for shipping goods such as iron ore and grains. The trading volume of dry freight derivatives, a market estimated to be worth about $200 billion in 2007, grew as those needing ships attempted to contain their risks and investment banks and hedge funds looked to make profits from speculating on price movements. At the close of the 2007 financial year, the number of traded lots on dry FFAs doubled the derived physical product.

Shanghai Shipping Freight Exchange is the first electronic shipping freight exchange in the world. It has three lines of businesses, including International Dry Bulk, Domestic Coastal Coal, and International Container. The container freight derivatives were launched in 2011 and shortly became the most liquid container freight contracts. Based on the success and experience from container freight contracts, SSEFC launched coastal coal contracts in 2012. In 2014, in order to better achieve the risk shifting effect of shipping freight derivatives, SSEFC innovated and launched the world's first physical-deliverable shipping capacity contract.

== The sale and purchase market ==
In the sale and purchase market, second-hand ships are traded between shipowners. The administrative procedures used are roughly the same as in the real-estate business, using a standard contract. Trading ships is an important source of revenue for shipowners, as the prices are very volatile. The second hand value of ships depends on freight rates, age, inflation and expectations.

== The shipbuilding market ==
The newbuilding market deals with transactions between shipowners and shipbuilders. Contract negotiation can be very complex and extend beyond price. They also cover ship specifications, delivery date, stage payments and finance. The prices on the newbuilding market are very volatile and sometimes follow the prices on the sale and purchase market.

== The demolition market ==
On the demolition market, ships are sold for scrap. The transactions happen between shipowners and demolition merchants, often with speculators acting as intermediaries.

== See also ==
- Merchant navy
