= Bucks Fizz (disambiguation) =

Bucks Fizz was a British pop group.

Bucks Fizz or Buck's Fizz may also refer to:

- Buck's Fizz, an alcoholic cocktail beverage
- Bucks Fizz (album), a self-titled album by the band
