= Fizz (novel) =

2011 novel by Zvi Schreiber

Fizz: Nothing is as it seems
- Author: Zvi Schreiber
- Language: English
- Genre: Historical Fiction, Science
- Publisher: Zedess Publishing
- Publication date: 2011
- Publication place: Israel
- Media type: Print (Paperback) and eBook
- Pages: 526
- ISBN: 978-0-9833968-1-9

Fizz is a novel by Zvi Schreiber centered on the history of physics. It tells the story of a young woman from the future named Fizz, who time travels to meet physicists such as Aristotle, Galileo, Newton and Einstein, and discuss their work. Fizz brands itself as an "edu-novel" with similarity to the genre of Sophie's World. The book claims to target both young adults and adults, with an amateur interest in physics, as well as teachers and students of physics.

== Plot summary ==
Fizz is a young woman from the "Eco-community" - a future sect which abandons science and technology. Her father has left this community and invented a time machine. Driven by curiosity about the physical world, Fizz borrows her father's time machine and visits many past physicists from Aristotle to Stephen Hawking.

Each chapter combines some discussion of physics with some fictional plot and personal development of Fizz. Eventually Fizz returns to the future to choose between life inside or outside the eco-community.

== Reception ==
Only a small number of reviews have been published since publication in July 2011. Fizz won a five star rating from ForeWord magazine's Clarion review. The American Association of Physics Teachers invited members to consider trying Fizz in classroom pilots in the July 2011 newsletter. and reviewed it in the Physics Teacher magazine.
