= Ben Going =

American YouTuber

- Born: June 15, 1985 (age 41); Cocoa, Florida, U.S.
- Other name: boh3m3

YouTube information
- Channel: boh3m3
- Years active: 2006–11, 2013–present
- Genres: Vlogs; stunt performance
- Subscribers: 27.2 thousand
- Views: 1.51 million
- Last updated: 17 July 2024
- Website: www.boh3m3.net

Ben Going (born June 15, 1985), is an American YouTuber who was prominent during 2006 and 2007. He was based in Torrance, California, and is one of the site's earliest YouTube Partners.

Most of Going's videos are shot in black-and-white. He has claimed to be "the only person on the (YouTube) Most Subscribed List that swears excessively". He wears a signature black hat often in his videos. Subjects of Going's vlogs have included pop culture, the news media, and the state of the YouTube community, in addition to personal anecdotes.

== YouTube ==
Going intended that his first submission to YouTube, posted in May 2006, serve as an audition tape for MTV's "Jackass". That failing, he went on to adopt a vlogger personality that has worked to give him over 44,000 subscribers and a top spot on YouTube's Most Subscribed list.

Two of his videos, No Swearing! (posted June 6, 2006), and Why Do YouTube? (posted November 29, 2006, but has since been removed), were featured on YouTube's homepage and each has a view count over 900,000. Various news outlets have approached Going for his opinion on the state of the YouTube community or YouTube in general.

Stemming from his video channel's exposure, YouTube paid Going to produce two videos for use in holiday-themed, corporate sponsored promotions in December 2006. The first to be released as part of the YouTube and Coca-Cola Holiday Wish Cast, sponsored by Coca-Cola.

According to Ad week, this promotion marked the first time YouTube made an ad deal with its top users. The second was featured on YouTube's homepage for the YouTube New Year's Eve Countdown, which was put on in partnership with Warner Music Group and sponsored by Chevrolet.

Stickam has credited Going for bringing 1,000 new users to its video networking website hours after he advertised his presence there on YouTube. In January 2007, he hosted a live, 24-hour Stickam broadcast to raise awareness for the Darfur conflict.

In addition to several other popular YouTubers, Going worked with Barenaked Ladies to produce a music video for their single "Sound of Your Voice" in February 2007. The video has been featured on the Bare-naked Ladies' homepage.

In May 2007, YouTube entered Going as one of the first users to take part in its partnership program. As a YouTube partner, Going can capitalize on "promotional opportunities" and advertiser-based revenue sharing. He was one of the first twenty to thirty YouTubers to have this status. Although The New York Times once quoted Going's saying that he hopes "video blogging might become some kind of career," since becoming a YouTube partner he has retracted that statement.

=== YouTubers for net neutrality ===
On August 17, 2006, Going posted Save the Internet! to YouTube. Described by Newsday as "a one-minute, black-and-white, tech-age public service announcement", the video, which Going scripted, presents a short argument for net neutrality that includes video appearances by YouTube users Tony Huynh, Barats and Bereta, and Brandon Hardesty, among others.

Free Press blog SavetheInternet.com subsequently featured it, leading the video to gain a view count in excess of 500,000. Of the video, Salon.com quoted Ben Scott, one of the coordinators of SaveTheInternet.com, to have said that Going's "Save the Internet!" "is doing the work of 30 full-time communications professionals".

=== Vegemite wars ===
In February 2007, Australian news program A Current Affair picked up Going's January 27, 2007, The Australians are Fooling Us All! and used it to springboard a mock defense of Vegemite. In his video, Going imagines the substance to be made of "yeast, salt, and pain." To counter, A Current Affair enlisted media personality Peter FitzSimons, who suggests Vegemite comprises, rather, "the distilled essence of Australia". Although the segment focuses on Going, it also features Australian YouTubers who profess a fondness for Vegemite, including Natalie Tran and Caitlin Hill. A reporter for The Age responded by questioning A Current Affair's journalistic integrity.

== Personal life ==
Going grew up in Cocoa, Florida, and lived there until just before he started high school. He waited tables in Huntsville, Alabama, at 1892 East throughout the earlier part of his YouTube career. In April 2007, Going moved to Torrance, California, after accepting an offer to apprentice under a professional music video director. The move was facilitated by fan contributions exceeding $1,000 made through PayPal.

== See also ==
- YouTube celebrities
- YouTube gatherings
