= Fundo Tehuén Airport =

- IATA: none; ICAO: SCFI

Summary
- Airport type: Public
- Serves: Frutillar, Chile
- Elevation AMSL: 377 ft / 115 m
- Coordinates: 41°05′32″S 073°07′38″W

Map
- Location of Fundo Tehuén Airport in Chile

Runways
Direction	Length		Surface
Direction	m	ft	Surface
03/21	727	2,385	Grass
- Source: Landings.com Google Maps GCM

Fundo Tehuén Airport (formerly Frutillar West Airport), (ICAO: SCFI) is an airstrip 6.8 kilometres (4.2 mi) northwest of Frutillar, a town in the Los Lagos Region of Chile.

Runway boundaries are not marked.

The Puerto Montt VOR-DME (Ident: MON) is 20.1 nautical miles (37.2 km) south of the airstrip.

== See also ==
- Transport in Chile
- List of airports in Chile
