= Aventi Technology =

Aventi Technology AS
- Company type: Private
- Industry: Industrial automation
- Founded: Oslo, Norway (1986)
- Founder: Terje Hundere
- Headquarters: Økern; Oslo, Norway
- Area served: Worldwide
- Key people: Terje Hundere (General Manager)
- Number of employees: 20
- Website: www.aventi.no

Aventi Technology is a Norwegian private company headquartered at Økern in Oslo, Norway. The company specialises in industrial automation and is active in the Road traffic, Energy and environment, as well as Oil and gas sectors.

== Projects ==
Aventi is an active bidder to contracts issued by the Norwegian Public Roads Administration or subcontractors thereof, including automation solutions for the Bjørvika Tunnel and Festning Tunnel projects as well as road development and upgrade work, e.g. the Boksrud-Minnesund connection on E6.
