= Cory Williams =

American internet personality (born 1981)

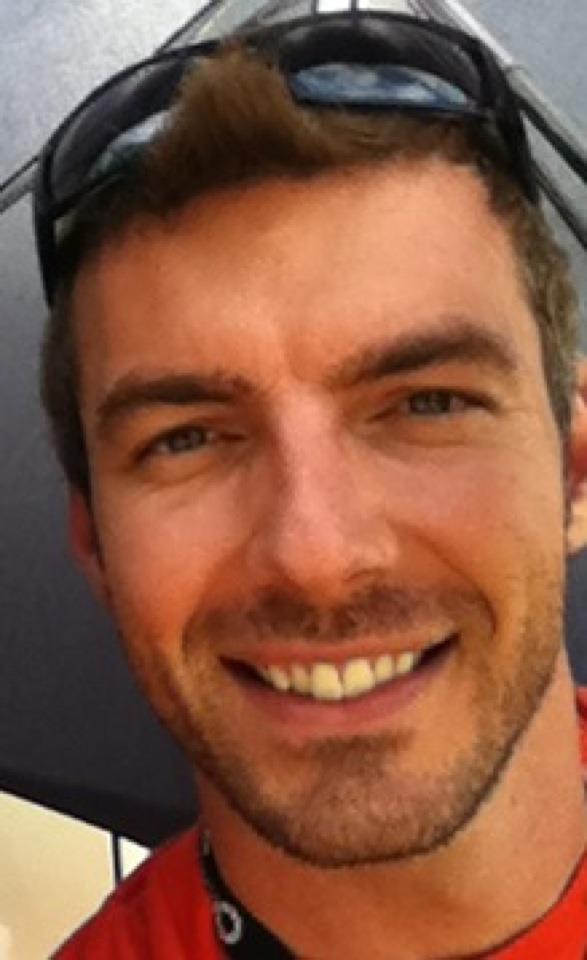
- Williams in 2014
- Born: August 5, 1981 (age 45); Merced, California, United States
- Other names: DudeLikeHella, Mr. Safety, SMP Films, TheMeanKitty, LiveEachDay, Captain Adventure
- Years active: 1999, 2005–present
- Known for: Internet videos
- Notable work: "The Mean Kitty Song" "Coolest Sound Ever"
- Television: KTVA Daybreak
- Spouses: Stephanie Roby (divorced) Kristen (m. 2015)
- Children: 2
- Website: www.youtube.com/smpfilms

Cory Williams (born August 5, 1981), also known as Mr. Safety, is an American YouTube personality who currently resides in Oklahoma.

"The Mean Kitty Song" was his most popular video, with over 90 million views, until December 2018 when his video "How To Get A Kitty Belly" surpassed it, reaching over 168 million views.

== Early life and work ==
Williams had previously been filming comedy sketches in his younger years. In 2006, Williams uploaded two videos to his YouTube channel, SMP Films of his first comedy sketches from 1999, when he lived in Turlock. These videos were called, "Turlock Cops" and "STOPMAN."

Williams started streaming online video in March 2005 on Newgrounds. He developed a following by posting original music tracks to his MySpace profile, leading MySpace to sponsor him on a cross-country tour. In September 2005, Golden Palace Casino sponsored Williams, making him the first video blogger to receive corporate sponsorship.

== YouTube ==
Williams' video output includes music, sketch comedy and short films.

=== SMPFilms ===
As of August 2023, Williams' main YouTube channel, smpfilms, has acquired over 630,000 subscribers and over 195 million video views. He was one of the first 30 users to be chosen for YouTube's revenue-sharing "partner" program.

"The Mean Kitty Song" or "Hey Little Sparta," based on his cat with the same name, is Williams' most popular video on the channel. As of August 2023, it has attracted over 92 million views. In one year, it became the top 21 of YouTube's list of all-time favorite videos. The video was also aired by a number of television shows, including CBS' The Early Show.

On December 10, 2008, Williams was mentioned on the front page of The New York Times as being one of YouTube's top earners. "Half of the profits come from YouTube’s advertisements, and the other half come from sponsorships and product placements within his videos."

Williams has voiced frustration at YouTube's algorithm, announcing he would leave the platform in 2019 after losing "96% of his viewership"; a decision he later reversed.

=== TheMeanKitty ===
In 2008, following the success of his Mean Kitty Song video, Williams launched a spinoff channel, named TheMeanKitty. It includes funny moments and short films focused on his cats Loki and Sparta.

On September 17, 2014, Williams posted a vlog titled, "Chuck E. Cheese STOLE MY VIDEO!" in which he discovers and talks about Chuck E. Cheese's stealing one of his Mean Kitty videos, even though it lacked a Creative Commons license. Chuck E. Cheese posted a response on the same day, ensuring that his stolen video is no longer playing in their stores and that they have reached out to him about it. He got a response a day later, however on September 25, he later said that Chuck E. Cheese's was lying when they said they were working things out with him and detailed his disappointment with them.

Williams' video on TheMeanKitty channel titled "How To Get A Kitty Belly" is his most-viewed video across all of his platforms. After being posted on August 14, 2017, it went viral, acquiring more than 176 million views.

On March 31, 2018, a video on TheMeanKitty channel reported that Loki had died at the age of 10. The video did not mention the cause of death.

On June 14, 2020, Williams revealed that Sparta had been found panting and unable to move from his waist down. Less than an hour later, Cory took Sparta to the vet and found out he had an underlying heart disease that they did not know about. The heart disease had led to a saddle thrombus, which is a blood clot that blocks the back legs, resulting in severe pain and paralysis. Sparta died in Cory's arms at 9:52 am. Williams later uploaded a video to TheMeanKitty, revealing the news and stating it would be the last one posted on the channel.

=== Vlogging ===
On May 19, 2011, Williams launched a vlogging channel, named DudeLikeHELLA, on which he posts video diaries showing his daily life and opinions. He also shared his experiences moving to Alaska and then Oklahoma, as well as starting a family.

The channel was renamed LiveEachDay in October 2016, stating that the latter name is a reminder to live in the moment and enjoy every day. As of August 2023, this channel has over 444,000 subscribers and over 124 million video views.

On October 13, 2014, Williams uploaded a video entitled, "Coolest Sound Ever" to his DudeLikeHELLA channel in which he skips a rock against a frozen lake and it makes an interesting sound due to flexural waves. It went viral, obtaining over 6.4 million views in five days, making it his most popular video on that channel, and led to news interviews and articles about the video.

=== Other YouTube work ===
Mr. Safety, another channel owned by Williams, was created in March 2014 and includes music videos made by himself. As of August 2023, it has obtained over 55,000 subscribers and over 18 million video views.

Williams regularly appeared on Kate Elliott's daily vlogs until she closed her channel. His cats, Loki and Sparta (often referred to as Poki and Moo, respectively) also made appearances.

Williams is also a 3D artist and motion capture specialist, and creates animated video content using Unreal Engine. As of 2023, he produces short animated videos for children, on the YouTube channel JustForKids.

== Television and film ==
In November 2006, Williams became the host of the first national TV show to spawn from video bloggers, called The FIZZ on DirecTV channel 101 in the United States.

Williams has appeared on The Tonight Show with Jay Leno and MTV's Scarred.

In early October 2007, Williams starred in his first feature film role as the character "Hunter" in the movie Faded Memories, which opened in theaters on November 14, 2008. The first trailer to the movie was released on YouTube, August 3, 2008. Williams also has a cameo in the music video "Uhn Tiss Uhn Tiss Uhn Tiss" by Bloodhound Gang as well as "White People For Peace" by Against Me!.

In October 2014, Williams appeared on Alaskan local station KTVA to talk about his experiences with his move to, and life in, Alaska, and about his viral video "Coolest Sound Ever." It was later announced that Williams would have a weekly slot on their Daybreak morning show, where he would talk about his latest stories and goings-on in the state.

Williams has revealed that a number of production companies had approached him asking to produce a televised reality show based on his life in Alaska and his DudeLikeHELLA video blogging channel. However, in 2014 Williams stated that he had turned all the offers down, saying "Why fix what isn’t broken? We’re already loving this. This is all we’re doing. It’s just me, the camera and it’s us". Williams added however that if an opportunity comes up later on, in which he could explore more of the world, he would be open to the idea of starring in a reality TV show.

On January 27, 2017, it was announced that Williams would be a participant on the Discovery Channel reality series, Naked and Afraid. He appeared on the August 20 episode "Belize Breakdown", alongside professional surfer Anastasia Ashley, where he lasted 11 days out of a 14-day goal.

== Other work ==
=== "As One" ===
Williams is the founder and West Coast American Event Coordinator of the international gathering of YouTube users dubbed As One The first "As One" gathering was held in January 2007 in Hollywood, California, and Williams' associated video went on to receive over 1.3 million views. The second gathering was held at Pier 39 in San Francisco, California in February 2007.

== Personal life ==
Williams was diagnosed with ADD as a child.

Williams was engaged and married to Stephanie Roby.

Williams married Kristen, an engineer, in May 2015.

On June 3, 2018, Kristen gave birth to their second child, a son.

== See also ==
- The FIZZ
- YouTube celebrities
