= Forward freight agreement =

Financial forward contract

A forward freight agreement (FFA) is a financial forward contract that allows ship owners, charterers and speculators to hedge against the volatility of freight rates. It gives the contract owner the right to buy and sell the price of freight for future dates. FFAs are built on an index composed of a shipping route for tanker or a basket of routes for dry bulk, contracts are traded ‘over the counter’ on a principal-to-principal basis and can be cleared through a clearing house.

Freight futures contracts settle over the average price of spot freight during the corresponding month. Given freight is intangible, there is no physical delivery. Rather, the contracts settle in cash against the arithmetic average price of spot freight published by the Baltic Exchange. The Baltic Exchange, on a daily basis, publishes a number of freight assessments for various shipping routes reflecting the prevailing level of shipping rates. Such assessments for the corresponding vessel classes are used to calculate the monthly average that freight futures settle against.

For Capesize freight futures contracts, the weighted average of 5 different routes globally is used to derive the daily 5TC Capesize index; for Panamax, 4 different routes is used to derive the daily 4TC Panamax index; for Supramax, the average of 10 different routes is used to derive the 10TC Supramax index. There are also numerous other assessments reflecting prevailing spot prices for different routes.

Freight futures clear through exchanges like other futures contracts, and are subject to similar margin requirements like other futures products. Currently major exchanges provide freight futures clearing, although the most common venues are the European Energy Exchange (EEX) and the Singapore Exchange (SGX). Each exchange provides its own rules and its own initial and maintenance margin requirements.

The freight derivatives market for dry cargo vessels saw a big increase in traded volumes in 2021. Dry forward freight agreement (FFA) volumes hit 2,524,271 lots, up 61% on 2020. Options trading in the dry market hit an all-time high of 409,255, up 25% on the previous year. The most heavily traded contract was settled against the Baltic Exchange's panamax timecharter assessment (PTC) which saw 1,202,432 lots traded in 2021.

Tanker FFA volumes were down 16% on the previous year, reaching 553,535 lots. Middle East Gulf to China (TD3C) was the favoured tanker contract with 304,719 lots changing hands.

One lot is defined as a day's hire of a vessel or 1,000 metric tonnes of ocean transportation of cargo.
