= Baltic Dry Index =

London-based daily shipping index

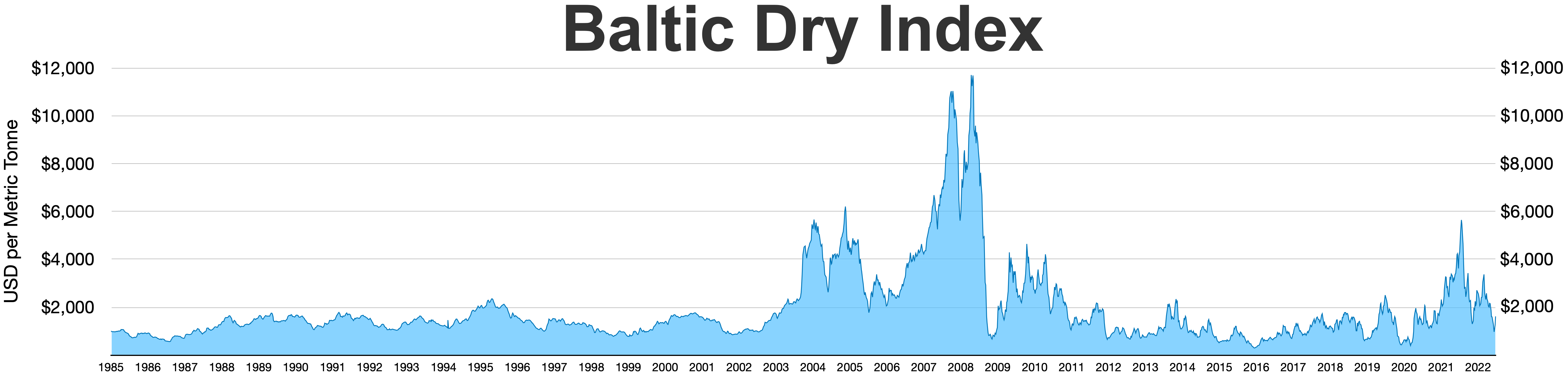
Baltic Dry Index 1985 - 2022

The Baltic Dry Index (BDI) is a shipping freight-cost index issued daily by the London-based Baltic Exchange. The BDI is a composite of the Capesize, Panamax and Supramax timecharter averages. It is reported around the world as a proxy for dry bulk shipping stocks as well as a general shipping market bellwether.

The BDI is the successor to the Baltic Freight Index (BFI) and came into operation on 1 November 1999. The BDI continues the established time series of the BFI, however, the voyages and vessels covered by the index have changed over time so caution should be exercised in assuming long term constancy of the data.

The index has also been regarded as an indicator of major turning points in commodity prices.

== Historical origin ==
In 1744, the Virginia and Maryland coffee house on Threadneedle Street, London, changed its name to Virginia and Baltick, to more accurately describe the business interests of the merchants who gathered there. Today's Baltic Exchange has its roots in a committee of merchants formed in 1823 to regulate trading and formalize the exchange of securities on the premises, which by then had moved to the Antwerp Tavern. The first daily freight index was published by the Baltic Exchange in January 1985.

== How it works ==
Every working day, a panel of international shipbrokers submits their assessment of the current freight cost on various routes to the Baltic Exchange. The routes are meant to be representative, i.e. large enough in volume to matter for the overall market.

These rate assessments are then weighted together to create both the overall BDI and the size specific Capesize, Panamax, and Supramax indices. The BDI factors in three different sizes of oceangoing dry bulk transport vessels:

The BDI is based on daily assessments of the following 20 routes:

Capesize (180,000 dwt)	
C8_14	Gibraltar/Hamburg transatlantic round
C9_14	Continent/Mediterranean trip China-Japan
C10_14	China-Japan transpacific round voyage
C14	China-Brazil round voyage
C16	China via Australia/Indonesia or South Africa or Brazil or US West Coast to UK/Continent/Mediterranean

Panamax (82,500 dwt)	
P1A_82	Skaw-Gib transatlantic round voyage
P2A_82	Skaw-Gib trip HK-S Korea incl Taiwan
P3A_82	HK-S Korea incl Taiwan 1 Pacific round voyage
P4_82	HK-S Korea incl Taiwan trip to Skaw-Gib
P6_82	Dely Spore or Busan (during US grain season) round voyage via Atlantic

Supramax (58,328 dwt)	
S1B_58	Canakkale trip via Med or Bl Sea to China-South Korea
S1C_58	US Gulf trip to China-south Japan
S2_58	North China one Australian or Pacific round voyage
S3_58	North China trip to West Africa
S4A_58	US Gulf trip to Skaw-Passero
S4B_58	Skaw-Passero trip to US Gulf
S5_58	West Africa trip via east coast South America to north China
S8_58	South China trip via Indonesia to east coast India
S9_58	West Africa trip via east coast South America to Skaw-Passero
S10_58	South China trip via Indonesia to south China

The BDI contains route assessments based only on time-charter hire rates "USD hire paid per day".

The index can be accessed on a subscription basis directly from the Baltic Exchange as well as from some financial information and news services such as Bloomberg and Reuters.

== Review of the weighting of the BDI ==
Following consultation with members, in January 2018 the Baltic Exchange announced that it will be implementing changes to the Baltic Dry Index (BDI). From 1 March 2018 the BDI will be re-weighted to the following ratios of timecharter assessments: 40% Capesize, 30% Panamax and 30% Supramax and will no longer include the Handysize timecharter average. A multiplier of 0.1 will be applied.

External research concluded that the contribution of the various dry bulk vessel types to the dry bulk market was 40% Capesize, 25% Panamax, 25% Supramax and 10% Handysize. This analysis was based on the fleet composition, vessel utilisation including ballasting and total cargo moved – based on import/export reports and AIS data, the BDI weightings will be reviewed on an annual basis. The decision to not include Handysize contributions makes no statistical difference to the calculation of the BDI, based on the above weightings.

The Baltic Exchange will continue to report the Handysize vessel market and in November 2017, as part of the ongoing review of its indices, launched a trial of a new Handysize Imabari 38 benchmark vessel and seven timecharter routes.

== Importance ==
Most directly, the index measures the demand for shipping capacity versus the supply of dry bulk carriers. The demand for shipping varies with the amount of cargo that is being traded or moved in various markets (supply and demand).

The supply of cargo ships is generally both tight and inelastic; it takes two years to build a new ship, and the cost of laying up a ship is too high to take out of trade for short intervals, the way you might park a car safely over the winter. So, marginal increases in demand can push the index higher quickly, and marginal demand decreases can cause the index to fall rapidly. e.g. "if you have 100 ships competing for 99 cargoes, rates go down, whereas if you've 99 ships competing for 100 cargoes, rates go up. In other words, small fleet changes and logistical matters can crash rates..." The index indirectly measures global supply and demand for the commodities shipped aboard dry bulk carriers, such as building materials, coal, metallic ores, and grains.

Because dry bulk primarily consists of materials that function as raw material inputs to the production of intermediate or finished goods, such as concrete, electricity, steel, and food, the index is also seen as an efficient economic indicator of future economic growth and production. The BDI is considered by some people as a leading economic indicator because it predicts future economic activity.

Other leading economic indicators, which serve as the foundation of important political and economic decisions, are often measured to serve narrow interests, and subjected to adjustments or revisions. Payroll or employment numbers are often estimates; consumer confidence appears to measure nothing more than sentiment, often with no link to actual consumer behavior; gross national product figures are consistently revised; and so forth. Unlike stock and bond markets, the BDI "is totally devoid of speculative content", says Howard Simons, an economist and columnist at TheStreet.com. "People don't book freighters unless they have cargo to move."

== Significant levels ==
On 20 May 2008, the index reached its record high level since its introduction in 1985, reaching 11,793 points. Half a year later, on 5 December 2008, the index had dropped by 94%, to 663 points, the lowest since 1986; though by 4 February 2009 it had recovered a little lost ground, back to 1,316. These low rates moved dangerously close to the combined operating costs of vessels, fuel, and crews.

By the end of 2008, shipping times had been already increased by reduced speeds to save fuel consumption, but lack of credit meant the reduction of letters of credit, historically required to load cargoes for departure at ports. Debt load of future ship construction was also a problem for shipping companies, with several major bankruptcies and implications for shipyards. This, combined with the collapsing price of raw commodities created a perfect storm for the world's marine commerce.

During 2009, the index recovered as high as 4661, but then bottomed out at 1043 in February, 2011, after continued deliveries of new ships and flooding in Australia.

Though rebounding to 2000 on 7 October, by 3 February 2012, the index made a new multi-decade low of 647 on a continued glut of dry bulk carriers and decreases in orders of iron and coal.

On 10 February 2016 the Baltic Dry Index reached the historic low of 290.

By 15 November 2016 it rebounded to over 1000 sending the entire shipping industry to massive gains. Some companies reached 2000%+ in share price gains in as little as 5 days.

== See also ==
- Freightos Baltic Index
- 2000s commodities boom
