= Freight rate =

Cost of transporting goods

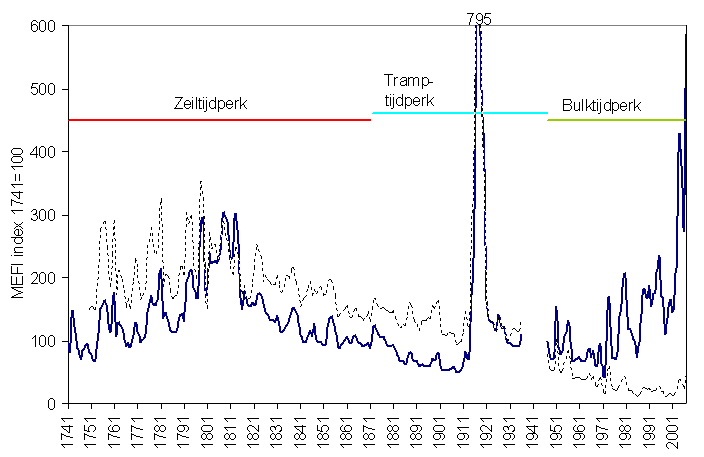

A freight rate (historically and in ship chartering simply freight) is a price at which a certain cargo is delivered from one point to another. The price depends on the form of the cargo, the mode of transport (truck, ship, train, aircraft), the weight of the cargo, and the distance to the delivery destination. Many shipping services, especially air carriers, use dimensional weight for calculating the price, which takes into account both weight and volume of the cargo.

For example, bulk coal long-distance rates in America are approximately 1 cent/ton-mile. So a 100 car train, each carrying 100 tons, over a distance of 1000 miles, would cost $100,000. On the other hand, Intermodal container shipping rates depend heavily on the route taken over the weight of the cargo, just as long as the container weight does not exceed the maximum loading capacity. Prices can vary between $300-$10,000 per Twenty foot equivalent unit (TEU) depending on the supply and demand of a given route.

In ship chartering, freight is the price which a charterer pays a shipowner for the use of a ship in a voyage charter.

== History ==
Freight Rate, the cost of transporting goods, is reflective of a number of factors aside from normal transportation costs. The main determining factors of freight rate are: mode of transportation (truck, ship, train, aircraft), weight, size, distance, points of pickup and delivery, and the actual goods being shipped. One of the earliest forms of freight transportation was by water. Many of the earliest settlements were built along or near seacoasts and navigable inland waterways. As these settlements grew, roads and later railroads and pipelines had to be built to transport freight to and from the navigable waterways, thus connecting the inland points of pickup and delivery which could not be reached by navigable waterways. The development of roads, railroads, and even pipelines allowed for the expansion of settlements inland and away from water ways. Transportation by ships is very limited in nature. If there are no navigable waterways close to the pickup point and destination then a good will not be transported by a ship. Rarely is any good transported solely by ship; usually goods coming into ports by ship must be unloaded and transferred onto another mode of transportation i.e. truck or railcar for transportation to its final destination. With the expansion of railroad systems and the development of more efficient trucks, the transportation of freight by ships became less cost effective. Networks, of roads and train tracks which once carried freight from coastal and inland waterway ports to destinations which were not accessible by means of marine transportation, greatly expanded making freight transportation from port to port overland more efficient and more affordable than the marine transportation of freight.

== How freight rate is determined ==
The cost which a shipper (the consumer or business providing goods for shipment) or consignee (the person or company to whom commodities are shipped) is charged for the transportation of goods is determined by a number of factors. The main factors in determining the freight rate are: mode of transportation, weight, size, distance, points of pickup and delivery, and the actual goods being shipped. All of these factors play their own independent role in determining the price or rate at which the freight will be transported but they are also all interconnected. When determining which mode of transportation will be used to deliver the freight to its destination there are many things which need to be taken into consideration which will all have an effect on the freight rate. Federal, State, and Local authorities all have their own laws and regulations with regards to the size, weight, and type of freight which can be transported on their roads. Transportation of freight by Rail, Water, or aircraft all have their own regulations which take into account Federal, State, and Local regulations as well as safety concerns which contribute to the rate at which freight is transported. In general, the more freight you transport, the cheaper it is. This is an important factor in the rate charged to people or companies shipping freight. There are many businesses out there whose sole purpose is to make the transportation of freight cheaper and easier for small businesses and individuals who need to move freight.

- Consolidators: a firm which groups together shipments from different companies into a single shipment
- Customs broker: A person or firm, licensed by the treasury department of their country when required, engaged in entering and clearing goods through Customs for a client (importer).
- Freight forwarder: A person whose business is to act as an agent on behalf of the shipper to arrange transportation services. A freight forwarder frequently makes the booking reservation. In the United States freight forwarders are licensed by the FMC as Ocean Transportation Intermediaries and are only designated freight forwarders for export shipments.
- Non-vessel-operating common carrier (NVOCC): A cargo consolidator in ocean trades that will buy space from a carrier and re-sell it to smaller shippers. The NVOCC issues bills of lading, publishes tariffs and otherwise conducts itself as an ocean common carrier, except that it will not provide the actual ocean or intermodal service

Most of the freight shipped within the United States travels by truck or railcar, but many of the people and businesses shipping freight do not have enough of a good to fill a whole truck or rail car every time they need something shipped.

Consolidators, customs brokers, freight forwarders, and NVOCC's can be a factor in determining freight rate because of their experience, business relationships, and the volume at which they operate. These factors help keep the freight rate down for small businesses and the individual with a shipping need. In the commercial trucking industry, many shippers tender loads to freight brokers whose job it is to find qualified carriers to move the freight at an acceptable price for all parties. Brokers have access to a suite of technological tools to help determine the most cost-effective way to move cargo, including access to load boards. The best load boards provide rate analysis tools based on actual transactions on every lane in North America, since their databases hold a wealth of pricing information. For example, DAT Solutions offers RateView for carriers, brokers and shippers, providing access to shippers' contract rates and spot market (broker buy) rates. This allows brokers to analyze market demand and capacity to assure competitive pricing.

== Trucking rate index ==
There has been a negative trend in freight rates. Freight prices are declining due to insufficient demand and a large number of truckers.

There are several factors that influenced the transportation business:

- The COVID-19 pandemic led to an increase in commodity prices.
- The 2022 Russian invasion of Ukraine. This has led to higher fuel prices.

At the same time, industrial goods still make up 70-80% of freight traffic, which will give truckers the opportunity to earn money, since manufacturing enterprises are still willing to pay for trucking.

Here you can find some Freight Rates for some types of trucks and several regions.

Van Freight Rates (August 30, 2022)
Highest average	Midwest	$2.69 per mile
Lowest average	Northeast	$2.41 per mile
Average Freight Rates		$2.53 per mile
Reefer Freight Rates (August 30, 2022)
Highest average	Midwest	$3.29 per mile
Lowest average	Southeast	$2.66 per mile
Average Freight Rates		$2.90 per mile
Flatbed Freight Rates (August 30, 2022)
Highest average	Midwest	$3.21 per mile
Lowest average	West	$2.69 per mile
Average Freight Rates		$3.07 per mile

== See also ==
- Worldscale, a unified system of establishing payment of freight rate for a given oil tanker's cargo
