= Zadi Diaz =

American producer and director

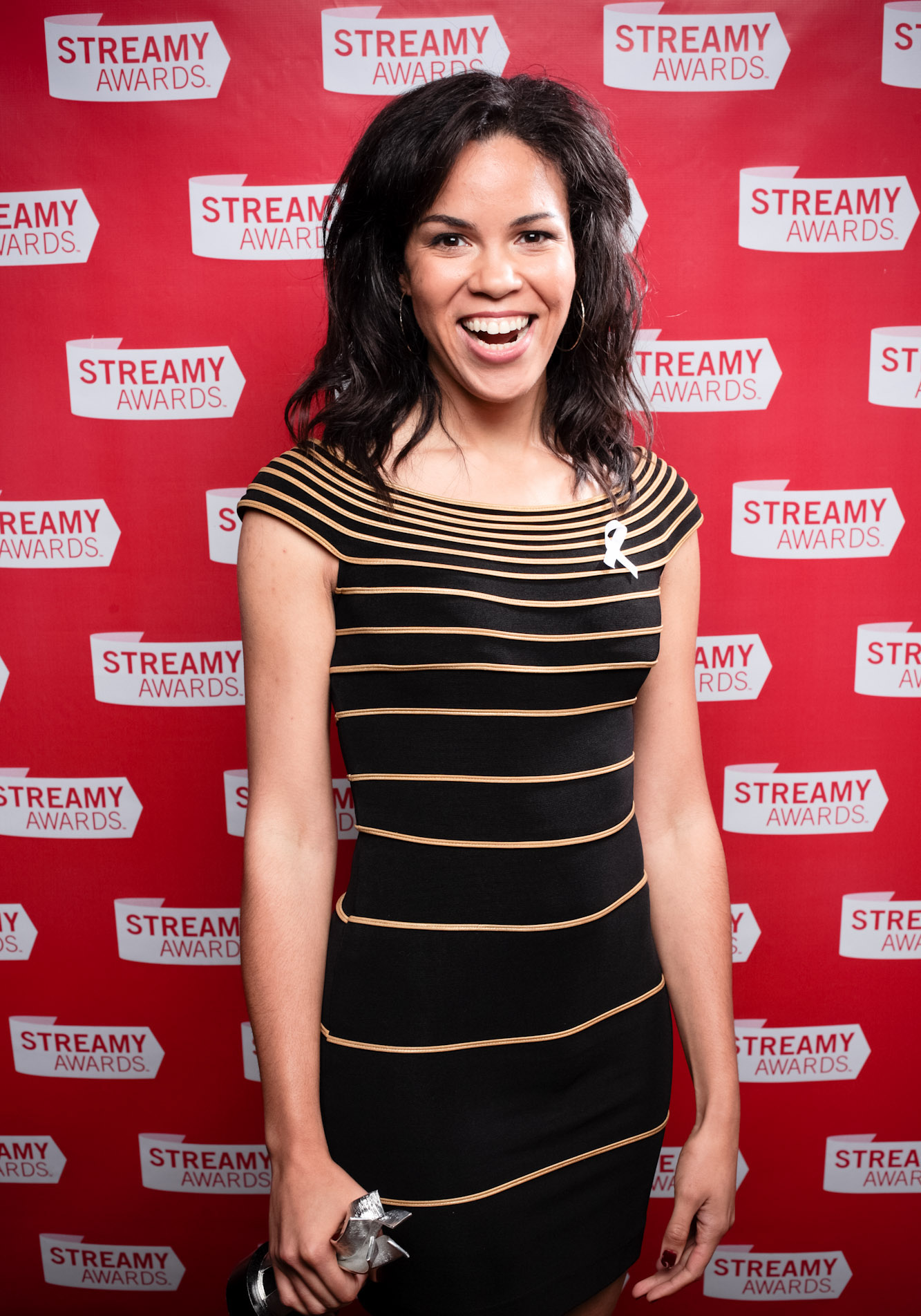
- Diaz at the 2009 Streamy Awards
- Born: New York City
- Occupations: video director, producer, podcaster
- Notable work: Epic Fu, New Mediacracy, Swampy's Underground Adventures, Talking Friends, Explored, Power Up, Blank: A Vinylmation Love Story
- Website: www.zadi.tv

Zadi Diaz is an American producer and director, known for founding the web series Epic Fu, co-hosting the podcast New Mediacracy, and executive producer of YouTube Nation. She has won a number of Webby and Streamy Awards.

== Early life ==
Zadi Diaz was born in Harlem, then grew up in the Washington Heights section of New York City, as well as the South Bronx. She is of Dominican descent.

== Career ==
=== New Mediacracy ===
Zadi Diaz co-founded the podcast New Mediacracy in 2006. Created with Steve Woolf and video blogger Steve Garfield, the podcast features candid discussions about online video and new media, and often features popular web series creators as guests. In 2010, Chris McCaleb of Big Fantastic joined the podcast as a regular. Notable guests have included Felicia Day, Joe Penna, Illeana Douglas, John August and Paul Scheer.

=== Epic Fu ===
She co-founded Epic Fu, which first premiered as JETSET (also referred to as Jet Set Show) on June 1, 2006, and was geared towards a young audience. Amanda Congdon and Andrew Baron were initially tied to the first few episodes of the production, but the partnership dissolved with the Rocketboom split in July 2006.

In April 2007, JETSET was the first established web show to sign with web video studio Next New Networks (NNN). In its tenure with NNN, the show grew from 30,000 to 40,000 views per episode to 3 million views a month. After briefly being signed to West Coast digital studio Revision3 in June 2008, Epic Fu is independently run and distributed through Blip.tv.

=== Disney Interactive ===
From 2012 to 2013 Zadi lead creative development and production for the online originals team at Disney Interactive Media Group. There she developed and produced the web series Where's My Water?: Swampy's Underground Adventures, Talking Friends, Blank: A Vinylmation Love Story, Power Up, Explored, and other digital shorts and one-offs.

== Speaking ==
She has spoken at events such as the New Media Expo in 2008.

== Awards ==
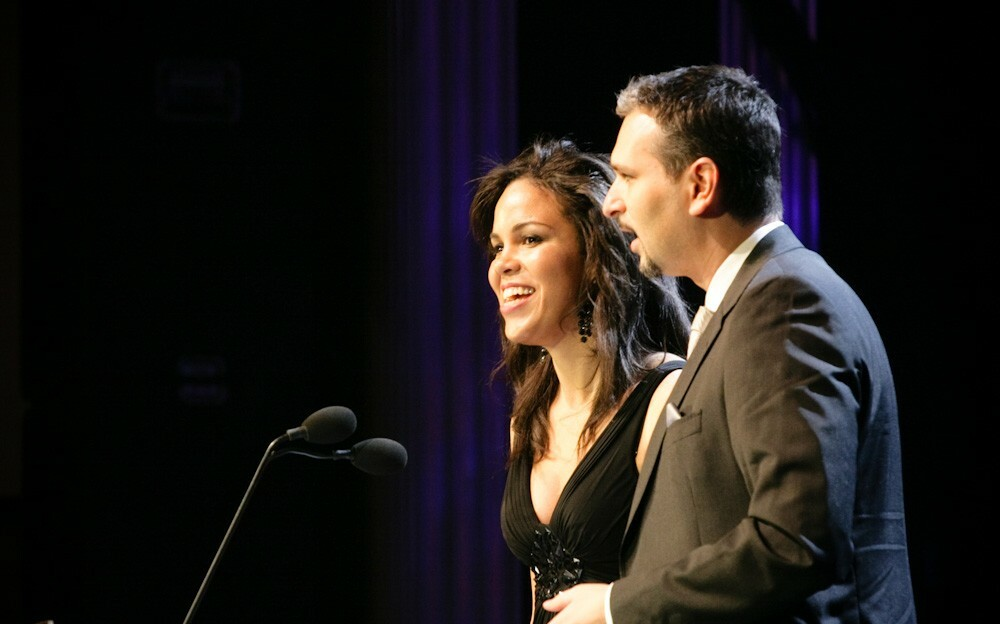
Diaz and Steve Woolf accepting their 2009 Streamy Award

Year	Award Show	Category	Result	Recipient(s)
2006	PodTech Vloggie Awards	Favorite Kids and Teens videoblog	Won	Epic Fu
2007	Webby Awards	People's Voice Winner - Music	Won	Epic Fu
2008	Webby Awards	Variety	Nominated	Epic Fu
2009	1st Streamy Awards	Best Hosted Web Series	Won	Epic Fu
2009	1st Streamy Awards	Best Web Series Host	Nominated	Zadi Diaz
2009	Webby Awards	People's Voice Winner - Best Reality/Variety Host	Won	Zadi Diaz
2009	Webby Awards	Variety	Nominated	Epic Fu
2010	2nd Streamy Awards	Best Web Series Host	Won	Zadi Diaz

=== Podcasts ===
- EPIC FU (2006)
- New Mediacracy
