= Epic Fu =

- Genre: Variety; News
- Created by: Steve Woolf; Zadi Diaz
- Directed by: Steve Woolf
- Presented by: Zadi Diaz
- Starring: Correspondents; Guests
- Country of origin: United States
- Original language: English
- No. of episodes: 171

Production
- Executive producers: Steve Woolf; Zadi Diaz
- Production location: Los Angeles
- Running time: 5-10 minutes

Original release
- Network: Epic Fu
- Release: June 1, 2006 – March 2011

Epic Fu (formerly known as JETSET) was a web series created by producers Steve Woolf and Zadi Diaz. The show premiered on June 1, 2006 with Zadi Diaz as the host and ended in 2011.

Airing weekly on the Epic Fu web site and various online distribution channels, the show draws its content from current news stories centered on art, music, technology and web culture.

== Format ==
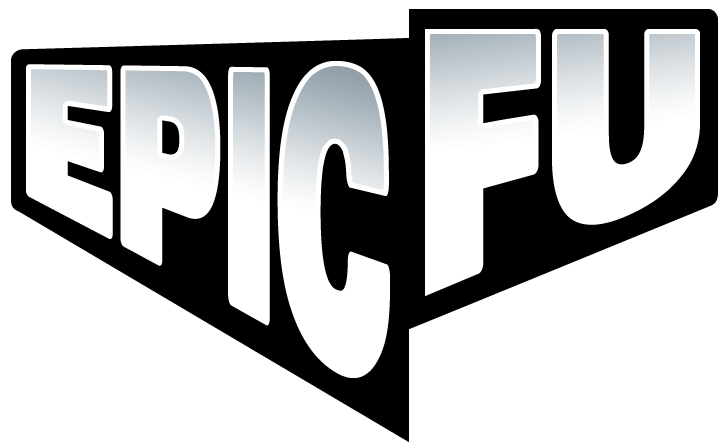
Epic Fu logo

Compared to Rolling Stone and MTV by Advertising Age and described as a hyperfast-paced pop culture newscast by Wired, each episode of Epic Fu runs an average of 5–10 minutes and is generally divided into four main sections: news, music, interviews, and community.

=== News ===
Every episode of Epic Fu begins with Diaz at her desk introducing the week's top stories. The news section often includes stories highlighting how technology and the web is affecting culture in art, music, style and politics. News stories are also submitted by audience members.

=== Music ===
The show typically includes a music video intermission called "Music Video Spotlight" also known as "Sh!t We Like," which highlights an independent or unsigned band or musician.

=== Interviews ===
Interviews appear in the second half of the show and are generally conducted on-location. Guests include web personalities, technologists, artists, musicians, political figures, inventors, authors, television personalities, and off-beat types.

=== Community ===
The Epic Fu community provede news links, correspondent pieces, and response videos to "Campfire" discussions. The central hub for the show's community is called MIX, currently involving over 4,000 of the show's fans, and is located on the Epic Fu website. There, fans upload photos, videos, music, submit ideas, and begin discussions on forum threads.

EPIC FU also uses social networking sites like Twitter and Facebook to connect with fans. The show regularly initiates collaborative projects to involve its community. Some of these have been a collaborative film, flash game battles, Alternate Reality Games (ARGs), and participation in an eco-challenge called Seven Days Without Plastic. Participating members are incorporated into the show.

== History ==
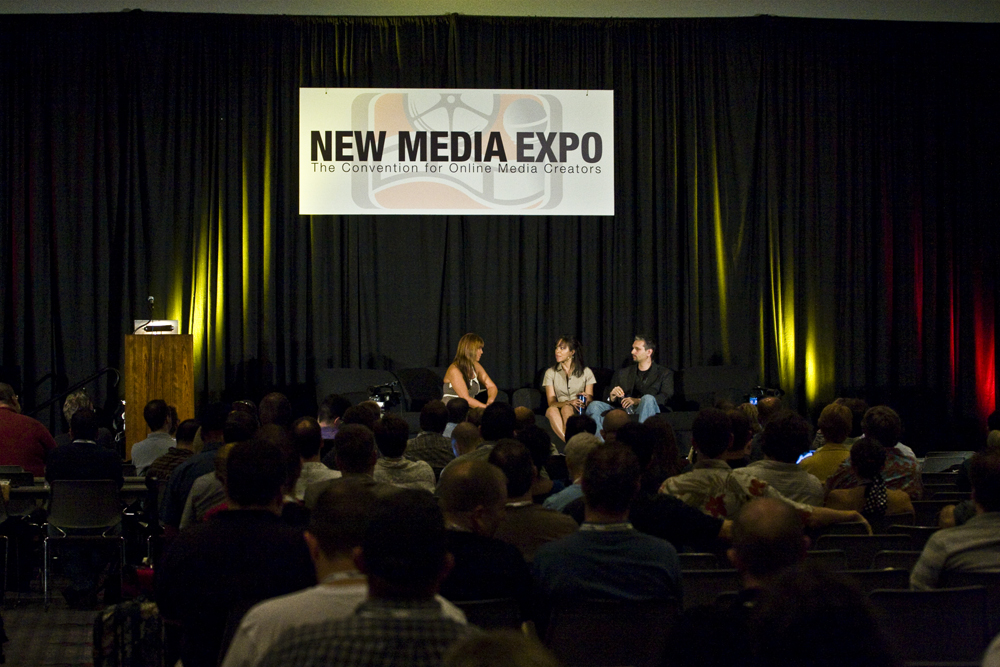
EPIC FU Producers Zadi Diaz and Steve Woolf giving keynote at New Media Expo 2008.

Epic Fu first premiered as JETSET (also referred to as Jet Set Show) on June 1, 2006. Amanda Congdon and Andrew Baron were initially tied to the first few episodes of the production, but the partnership dissolved with the Rocketboom split in July 2006.

In April 2007, JETSET was the first established web show to sign with web video studio Next New Networks (NNN). NNN took the role of selling sponsorship and handling cross-promotion for the show. In its tenure with NNN, the show grew from 30,000-40,000 views per episode to 3 million views a month.

In October 2007, Smashface Productions decided to change the name of the show from JETSET to Epic Fu, citing a need to protect their intellectual property with a more original name.

After a year with NNN, Epic Fu was contemplating a move to television, but then signed with West Coast digital studio Revision3 in June 2008. A the time, EPIC FU was the highest profile web show to switch from one new media studio to another. The partnership ended shortly after in December 2008, when Revision3 laid off nine employees, cancelled three original shows and eliminated two of its distribution deals, citing that the shows didn't fit with their long-term plans.

Currently, Epic Fu is independently run and distributed through Blip.tv.

== Production ==
Episodes of Epic Fu are produced by Smashface Productions and filmed in Los Angeles, California. Production is led by Diaz and Woolf.

The show has had various producers involved throughout its time on-air, including Brian Lerner and Rick Rey. Annie Tsai and Sarah Atwood have also helped in production efforts and occasionally acted as correspondents. Daniel Merlot and Mike Ambs have been credited as editors.

== Segments ==
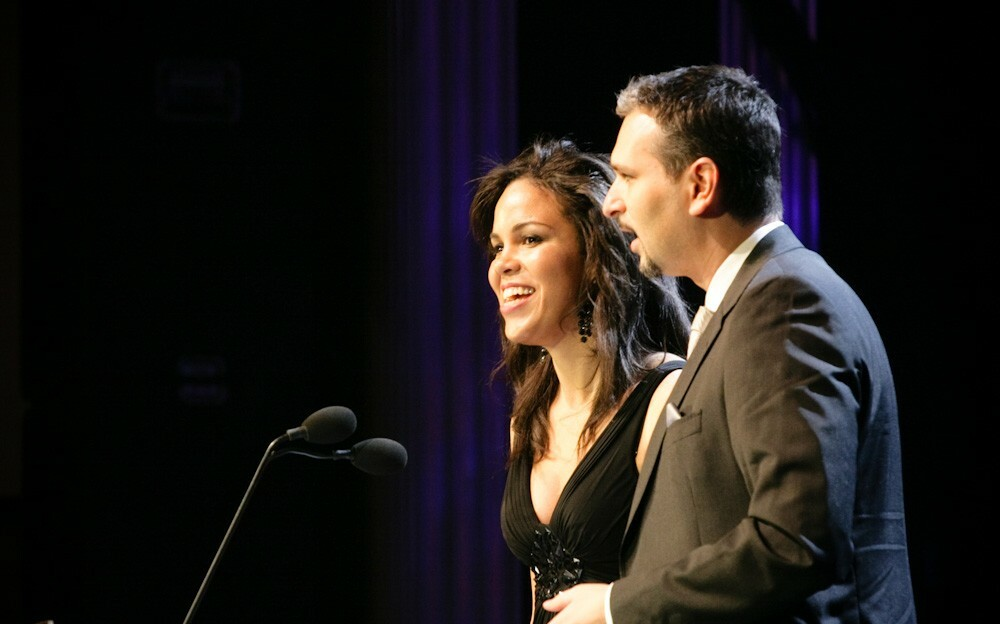
Diaz and Woolf accepting their 2009 Streamy award.

Below are past and present segments that have appeared on EPIC FU.

Title	Synopsis
Artist of the Week	A weekly profile highlighting an emerging independent artist. Generally artists featured in this segment are experimental in nature and are using the web to connect with their patrons.
Flash Game Challenge	A regular segment where viewers are asked to participate in an online game battle. Scores are posted on MIX, the EPIC FU community site, and the player with the highest score is called out in the next show and given "prime real estate" in the form of an image and link to their user page on the sidebar of the community site.
Music Spotlight/ Sh!t We Like	A weekly showcase of new music videos from independent bands and musicians.
FU of the Week	A weekly segment where someone who is challenging the status quo (giving the mainstream way of doing things the FU) is interviewed or showcased.
Campfire	A bi-weekly discussion with members of the EPIC FU community where member Q&A's are discussed and included in the show via video.
FUcabulary	A character segment where Steve Woolf dresses up as a coach and schools the viewer on new internet slang words.
Sarah's Rave Review	A character segment where Sarah Atwood gives movie and web video series reviews as she goes in and out of rave parties.
Rick Factor	A satire of tech news delivered by Rick Rey as a right-wing news commentator.
Blog of the Week	A segment where a favorite blog is picked and discussed.

== Notable interviews ==
A partial list of some of the people that have been interviewed on EPIC FU

- Arianna Huffington of The Huffington Post
- Chuck D of Public Enemy
- Dan Harmon & Rob Schrab, creators of Channel 101 and The Sarah Silverman Program
- Dr. Horrible writers Maurissa Tancharoen, Jed Whedon, Zack Whedon
- Elon Musk, founder of Tesla Motors and SpaceX
- Fatal1ty, pro gamer
- Felicia Day, actor and star of Dr. Horrible and The Guild
- Jonathan Coulton, singer-songwriter
- MC Frontalot, nerdcore hip-hop musician
- Patti Smith, singer-songwriter and Rock and Roll Hall of Fame musician
- Tim Heidecker & Eric Wareheim of Adult Swim's Tim and Eric Awesome Show, Great Job
- Xeni Jardin of Boing Boing

== Awards ==
Awards and nominations for Epic Fu
Year	Award Show	Category	Result	Recipient(s)
2006	PodTech Vloggie Awards	Favorite Kids and Teens videoblog	Won	
2007	Webby Awards	People's Voice Winner - Music	Won	
2008	Webby Awards	Variety	Nominated	
2009	1st Streamy Awards	Best Hosted Web Series	Won	
2009	1st Streamy Awards	Best Web Series Host	Nominated	Zadi Diaz
2009	Webby Awards	People's Voice Winner - Best Reality/Variety Host	Won	Zadi Diaz
2009	Webby Awards	Variety	Nominated	
2010	2nd Streamy Awards	Best Web Series Host	Won	Zadi Diaz
