= ROFLCon =

Convention of internet memes

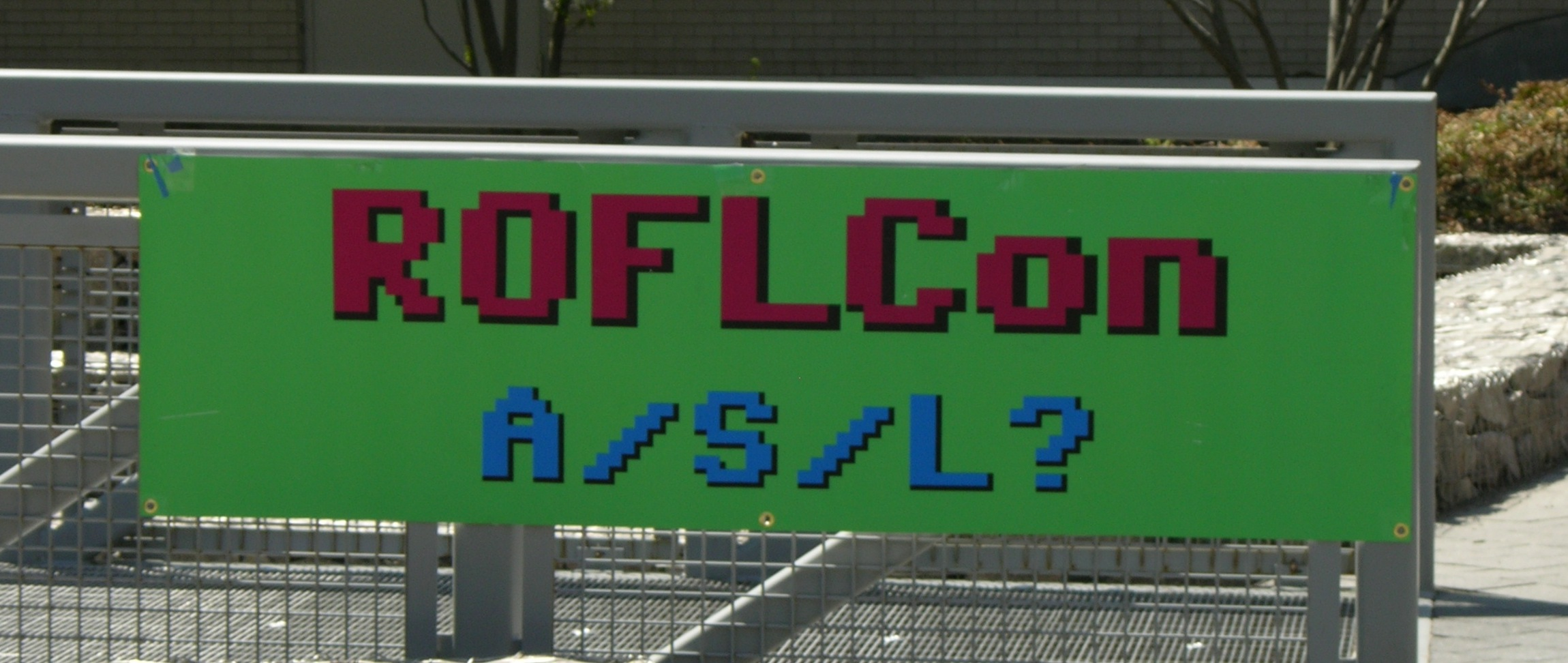
- Banner for the first ROFLCon, with A/S/L as a tagline
- Status: Retired
- Genre: Internet culture
- Venue: Massachusetts Institute of Technology
- Locations: Cambridge, Massachusetts
- Country: United States
- Inaugurated: 2008
- Attendance: ~600 in 2008
- Organizer: Harvard University Students
- Website: roflcon.org at the Wayback Machine (archived 2008-04-26)

ROFLCon was a biennial convention of internet memes that took place in 2008, 2010 and 2012, featuring various internet celebrities. All three events were at the Massachusetts Institute of Technology. ROFLCon was first organized by a group of students from Harvard University led by Tim Hwang. According to Hwang, the inspiration for the conference was the September 23, 2007 meetup of fans of xkcd with its creator, Randall Munroe, in a park in North Cambridge, Massachusetts.

The name "ROFLCon" comes from the internet slang "ROFL", short for "rolling on the floor laughing", and "con", short for "convention".

== The original ROFLCon ==
The first ROFLCon was first announced in late 2007, and took place on April 25–26, 2008.

Various internet celebrities attended, such as the authors of the webcomics xkcd, Questionable Content and Dinosaur comics, Jay Maynard "The Tron Guy", Christopher "moot" Poole, Leeroy Jenkins, The Brothers Chaps, and many others.

Attendance was open to the public after pre-registration and a fee. The primary events of ROFLCon were moderated panel discussions with the Internet celebrities, and question and answer sessions with the audience. Several guest speakers gave talks on issues pertaining to internet culture. The convention ended with the "ROFLConcert", featuring live performances by Group X, Leslie Hall, Lemon Demon, Trocadero and Denny Blaze.

== Subsequent events ==
ROFLCon II took place from April 30 to May 1 at MIT. Passes were available from $45 for a student to $500 for a "Mystery Pass." ROFLCon III took place on May 4–5, 2012, announced as the final ROFLCon.

== Gallery ==
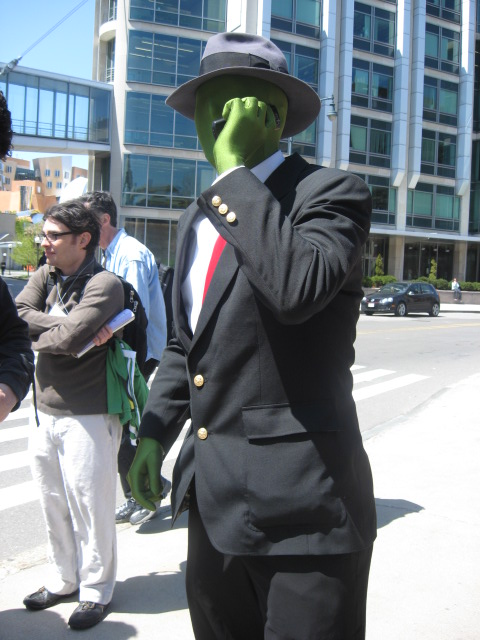
A member of Anonymous at ROFLCon I

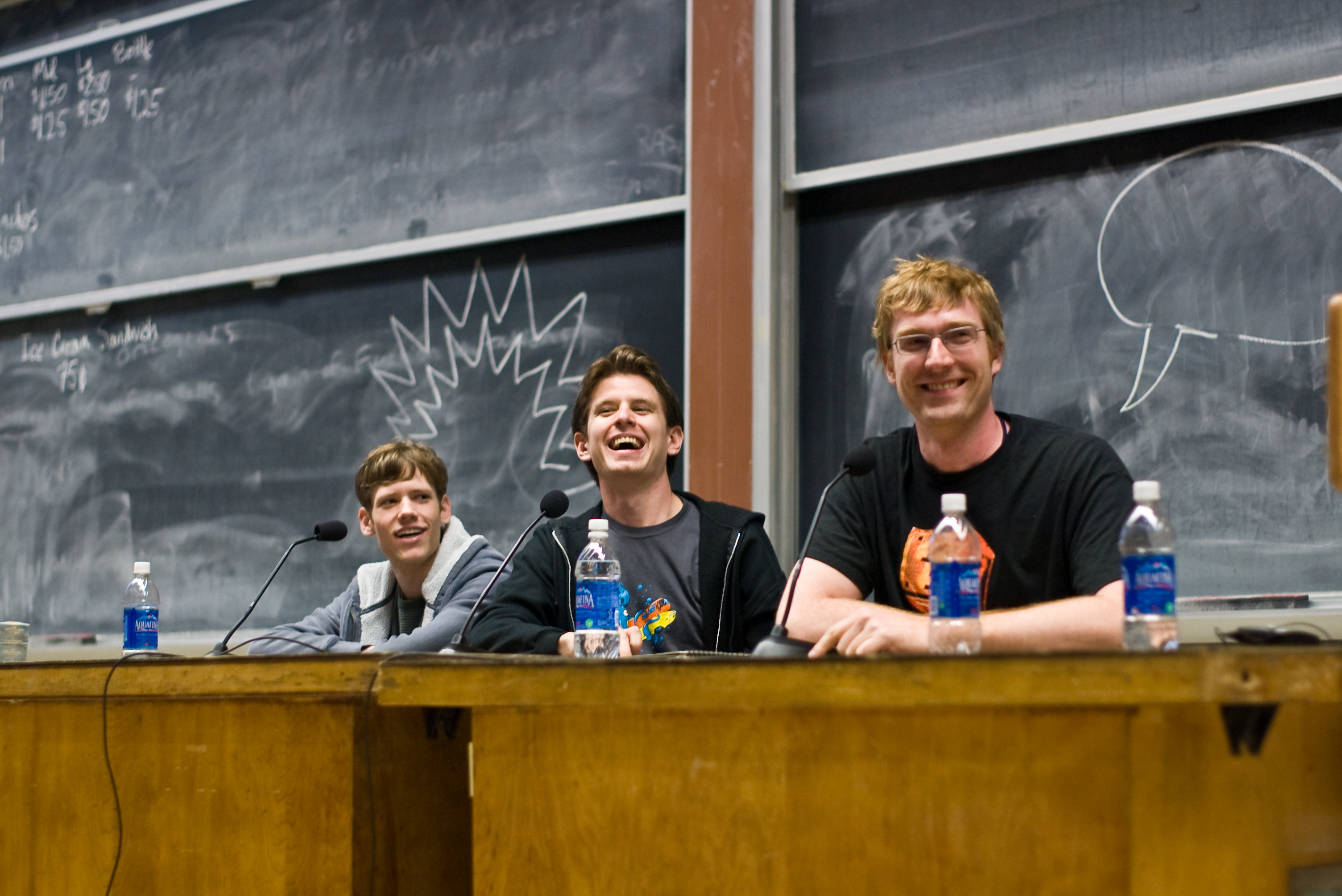
4chan founder moot (left) with webcomic creators Randall Munroe and Ryan North at ROFLCon I

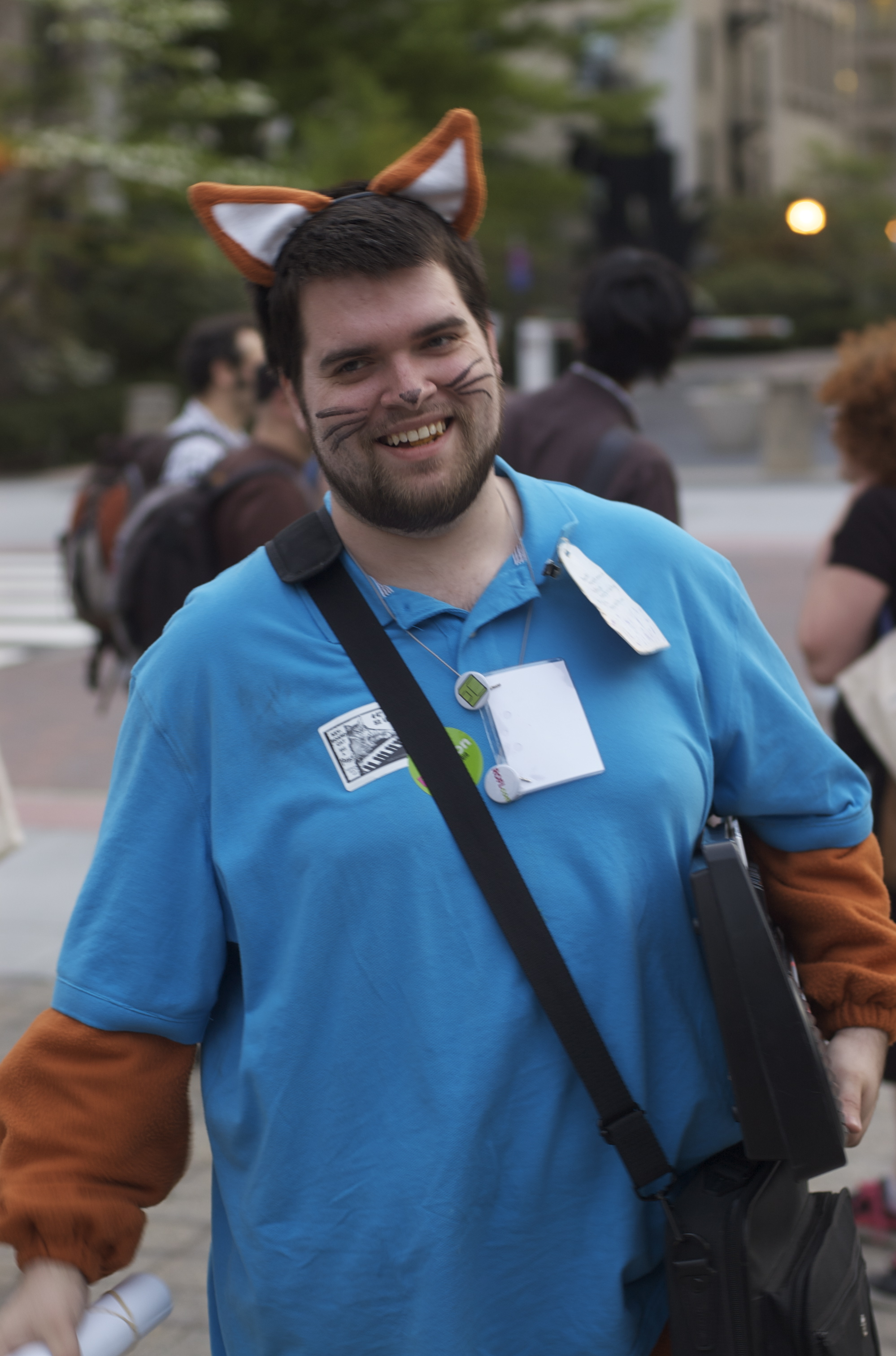
Brad O'Farrell of Keyboard Cat at ROFLCon II

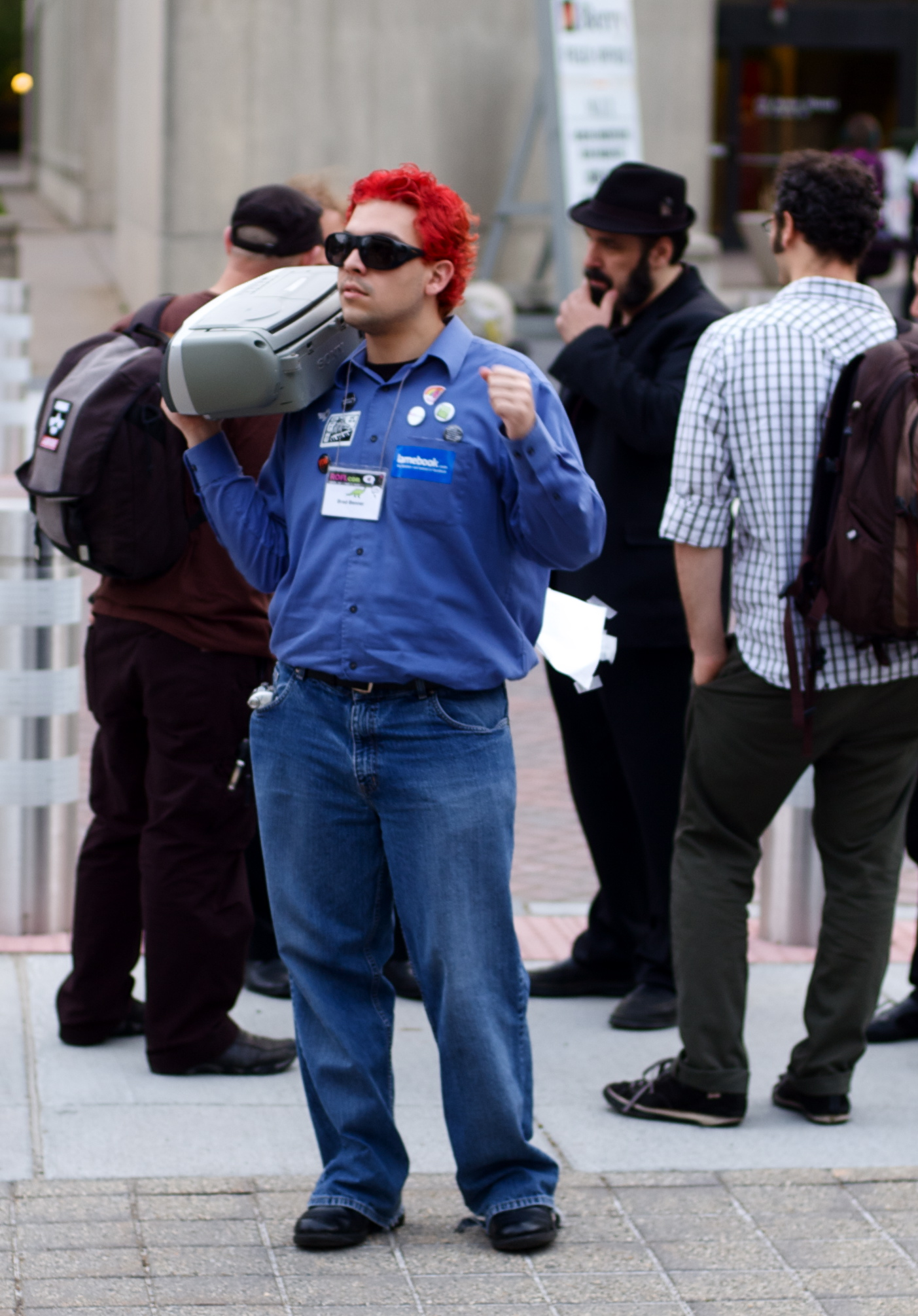
A live Rickroll at ROFLCon II

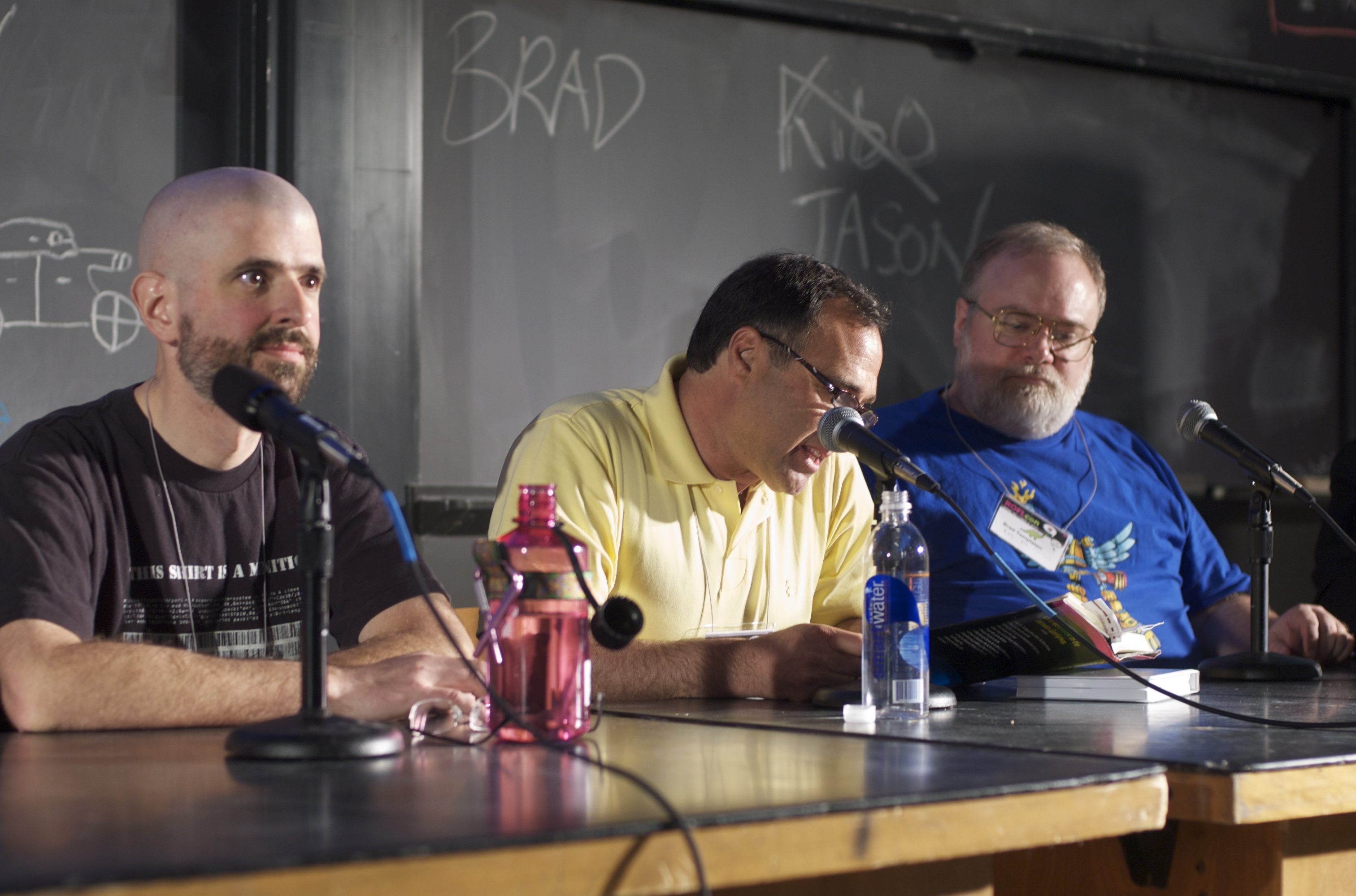
Jay Furr, Laurence Canter and Brad Templeton from the "Heroes of Usenet" panel at ROFLcon II

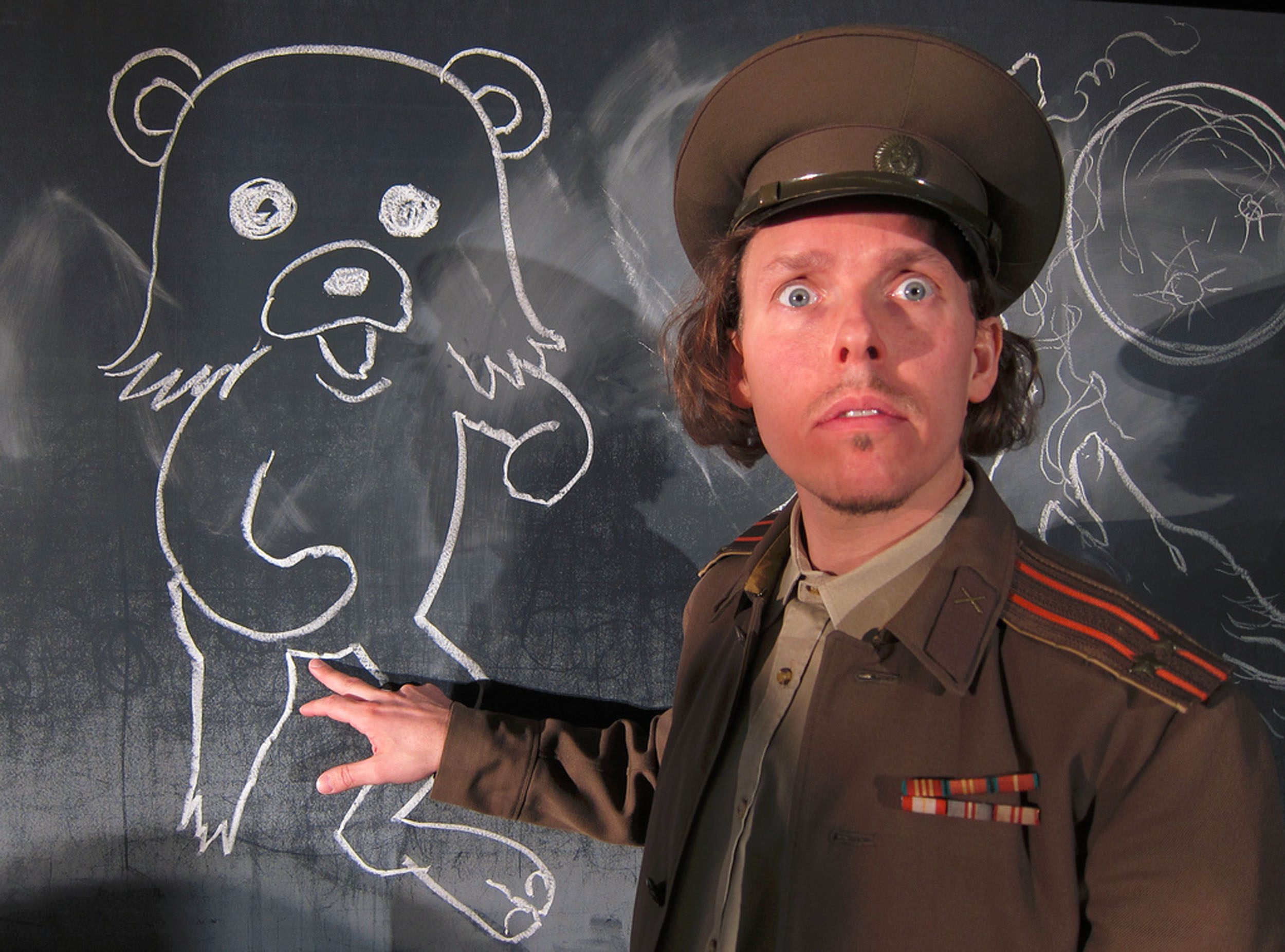
Artist and media researcher Johannes Grenzfurthner and Pedobear at ROFLCon II

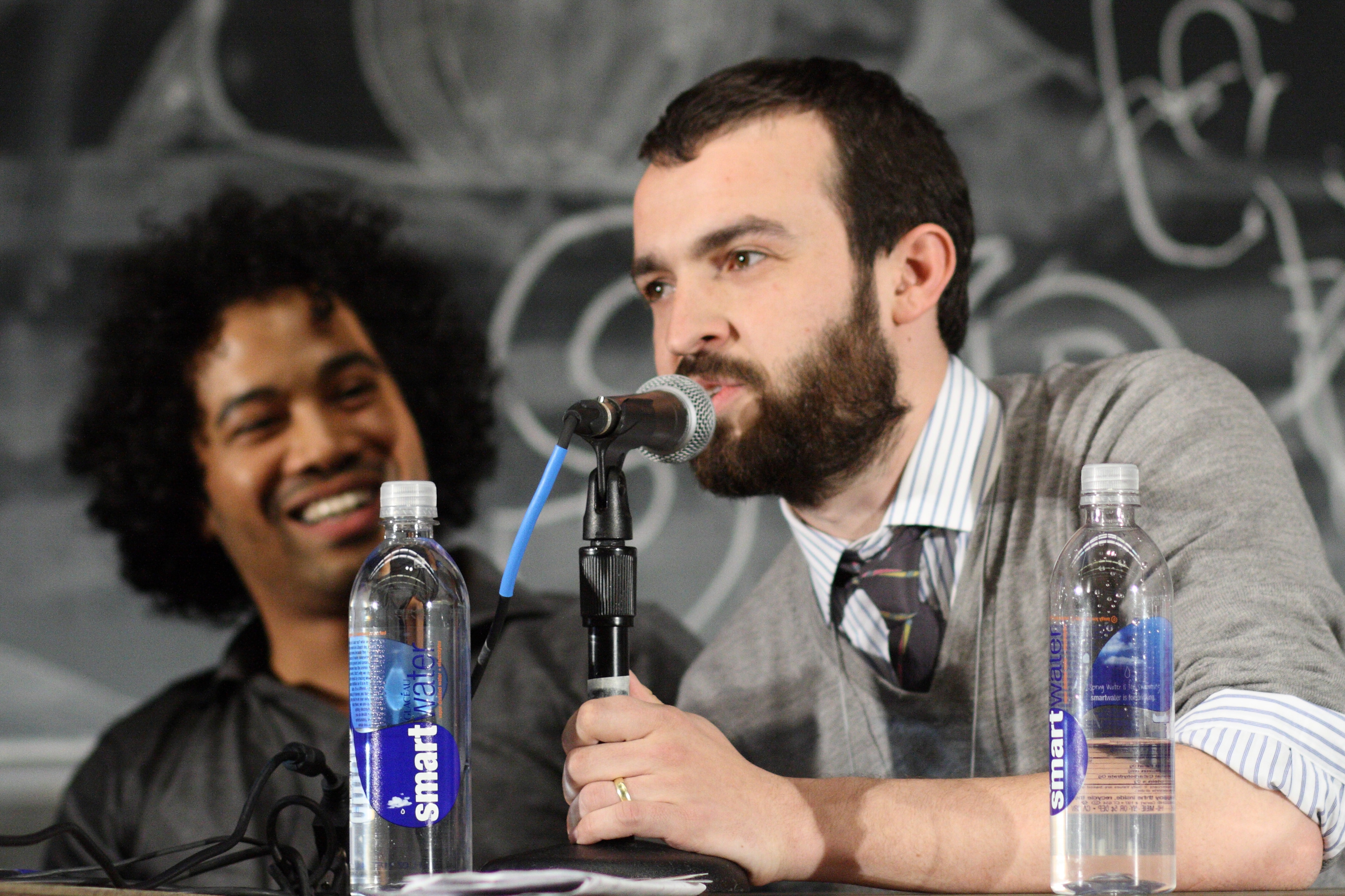
Jamie Wilkinson (right) and Kenyatta Cheese of Know Your Meme at ROFLCon II
