= Kenyatta Cheese =

American businessman

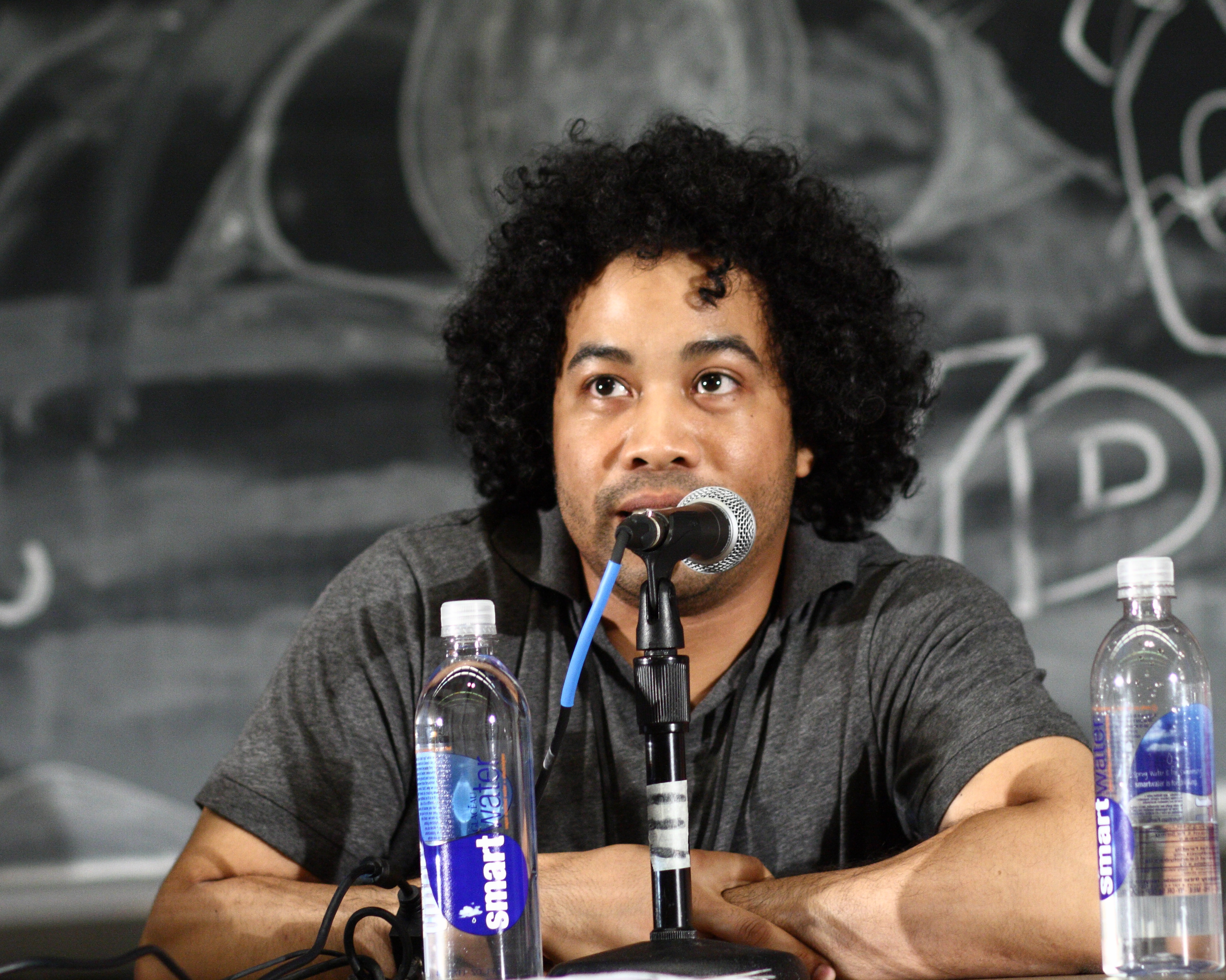
- Cheese in 2010
- Born: The Bronx, New York, U.S.
- Education: The College of New Jersey (BA)
- Occupations: Internet culture researcher, activist, software engineer, businessman
- Known for: Rocketboom, Know Your Meme, Everybody at Once

Kenyatta Cheese is an American Internet culture researcher, activist, software engineer, and businessman who is the co-founder and CEO of the digital consultancy group Everybody at Once. He previously co-founded, with Elspeth Rountree, Andrew Baron, and Jamie Wilkinson, the website Know Your Meme. Prior to co-founding Know Your Meme, he was an employee at Rocketboom.

== Biography ==
Cheese is from the South Bronx. He graduated with a degree in Communications Studies from The College of New Jersey in 1996.

Cheese created some of the first video blogs on the internet through the websites Durban Diaries and BrowseTV. He was later an employee at Rocketboom, developing the website's operations and infrastructure. He helped to organize communities through activism and initiatives such as Unmediated and the Eyebeam Center for Art and Technology. He created video and distribution tools for community media outlets in the New York City area, namely for the Manhattan Neighborhood Network. He has taught at the USC School of Cinematic Arts as part of their Interactive Arts division.

Cheese, along with Baron, Rountree, and Wilkinson, created Know Your Meme in their spare time while working at Rocketboom, later having dubbed themselves the Rocketboom Entity for Internet Studies. They later would create a series of episodes detailing the origins of various memes, of which Cheese was a co-host. In January 2011, Cheese, Rountree and other employees left Know Your Meme, claiming that Andrew Baron had created an "atmosphere of paranoia and competing egos" within the company; Baron disputed these charges.

In 2013, Cheese co-founded Everybody at Once, a digital consulting agency focused on developing online engagement and fanbases for various brands, with Kevin Slavin. The company was nominated for a Shorty Award at the 7th Shorty Awards ceremony in 2015 for the Best Small Agency category.

Cheese is a member of the board of the Urban Justice Center.
