= Steve Garfield =

American journalist

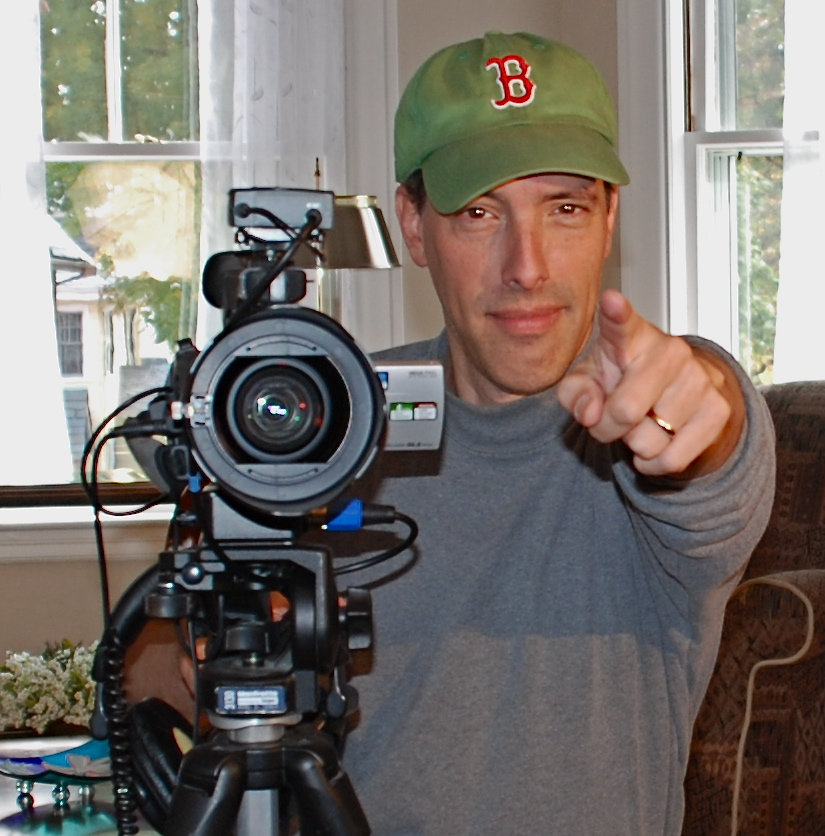
- Born: 1957 or 1958 (age 68–69)
- Occupations: videographer, video blogger
- Website: stevegarfield.com

Steve Garfield is an American videographer and video blogger based in Boston, Massachusetts. Known for shows such as New Mediacracy, in 2009 Garfield was inducted into the International Academy of Web Television.

== Career ==
One of the Internet's first video bloggers, Garfield began experimenting with the technique in 2002 and launched his own video blog on January 1, 2004.

Garfield is a former producer of the Boston-based Karlson and McKenzie radio show. He has produced his own video blog programs, including The Carol & Steve Show and Vlog Soup. On February 3, 2005, Garfield posted what is believed to be the first video blog from a United States elected politician, Boston City Councilor John Tobin. He has also contributed video to Rocketboom.

In 2006, Garfield co-founded the podcast New Mediacracy along with Steve Woolf & Zadi Diaz of Epic Fu. The podcast features candid discussions about online video and new media, and often features popular web series creators as guests.

In 2009, Steve was inducted into the International Academy of Web Television.

== Publications ==
Garfield wrote the book, Get Seen: Online Video Secrets to Building Your Business, which is the second in a series that David Meerman Scott edits for John Wiley & Sons called The New Rules of Social Media.
