= Know Your Meme =

Website and video series on memes

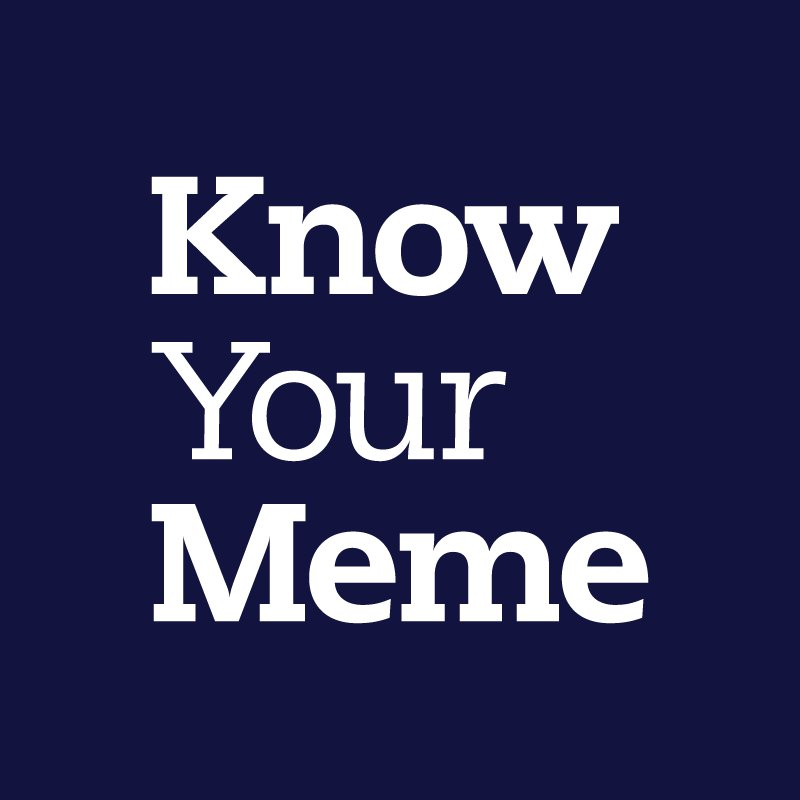
- Website type: Encyclopedia
- Available in: English
- Owner: Literally Media Ltd.
- Creator: Rocketboom
- Editor: Don Caldwell
- Website: knowyourmeme.com
- Registration: Optional
- Launched: November 25, 2007; 18 years ago
- Current status: Online

Know Your Meme (KYM) is an informational website and video series that uses wiki software to document various Internet memes and other online phenomena, such as viral videos, image macros, catchphrases and Internet celebrities. It also investigates new and changing memes through research, as it commercializes on the culture. Originally produced by Rocketboom, the website was acquired in March 2011 by Cheezburger Network, in turn acquired in 2016 by Literally Media. Know Your Meme includes sections for confirmed, submitted, deadpooled (rejected or incompletely documented), researching, and popular memes.

== History ==
=== 2007–2010: Web series origins ===
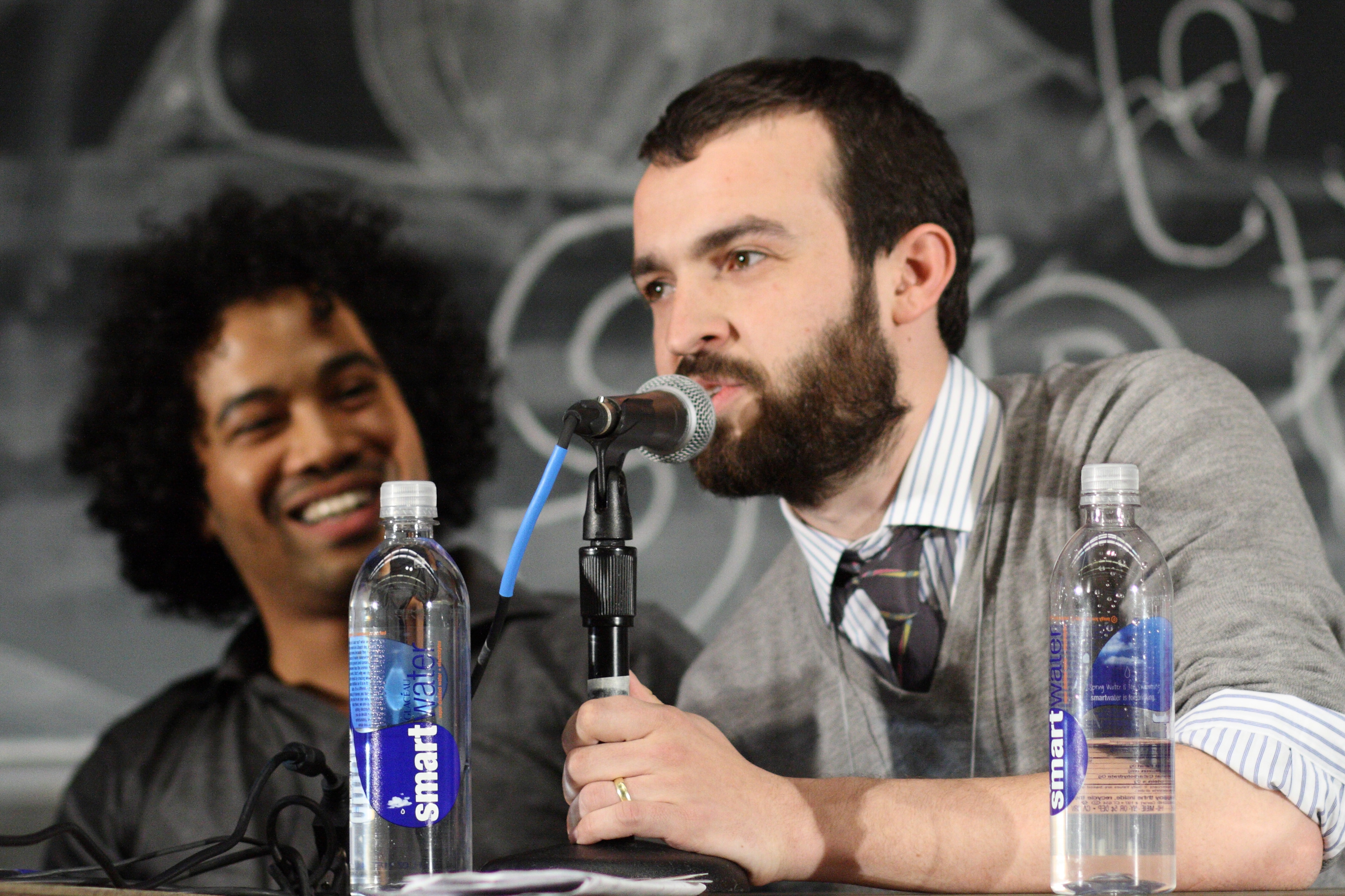
Jamie Wilkinson (right) and Kenyatta Cheese at ROFLCon II, 2010

Know Your Meme was created in December 2007 as a series of videos which were part of the vlog Rocketboom. It was founded by employees Kenyatta Cheese, Elspeth Rountree and Jamie Wilkinson, and Rocketboom CEO Andrew Baron in their spare time, when host Joanne Colan could not finish the current season of Rocketboom. They dubbed themselves the Rocketboom Entity for Internet Studies. Noticing that internet memes were used by advertisers who failed to acknowledge their online origins, they found that they could trace their source by using public search tools. They also found that media coverage of memes seemed uninterested in how they began and spread.

Each episode of Know Your Meme covered one meme in detail, exploring its history and context in internet culture. They were hosted variously by Colan, Cheese, Rountree and Wilkinson, who donned lab coats and dubbed themselves "meme experts". Baron noticed that each episode attracted more views than typical Rocketboom shows. According to Cheese, memes were only starting to become popular on sites such as 4chan when the series began, and Rocketboom allocated more resources as their popularity grew.

Wilkinson had also been developing a personal database of internet memes. It was repurposed as a companion to the videos and launched on the current website in 2008. Due to the size of the task, Rocketboom decided to crowdsource and hire interns, including Amanda Brennan and future editor Brad Kim, to develop content. This was then collated by volunteer moderators and a small editorial team. By 2010, Know Your Meme had attracted a large following and was more popular than the original web series. However, it also attracted hostility from some online communities: the website suffered constant DDoS attacks and the controversial Encyclopedia Dramatica said it was "mostly safe for work, which is fucking lame".

=== 2011–present: Sales to Cheezburger and Literally Media ===
In January 2011, Cheese, Rountree and other employees left Know Your Meme, claiming that Baron had created an "atmosphere of paranoia and competing egos" within the company; Baron disputed this and claimed that Cheese organized a "mass exodus [out of] personal vengeance". In March 2011, Baron sold the Know Your Meme website and web series to Cheezburger Network for an undisclosed seven-figure amount.

In April 2016, Cheezburger was acquired by Literally Media, an Israeli-based media company; their current CEO is Oren Katzeff. Literally Media is in turn owned by the private equity group 44ventures.

In June 2021, the Doge meme was minted as an NFT by Atsuko Sato, the meme's original creator, and sold on June 12, 2021, for 1696.9 ETH (approximately 4 million USD). The NFT sale was certified by Know Your Meme.

== Website ==
At the end of 2008, after more than a year of growth, Rocketboom released an expanded database with Jamie Wilkinson as the lead developer. The database includes entries for memes, trends and events, along with people and other aspects of subculture (such as films, video games, animated series and anime). Each entry has its own photo and GIF gallery; a video gallery was added in November 2010. As of January 2017, the database contained more than 2,700 entries of "confirmed" memes.

The administrators have a say on what gets confirmed and what gets "deadpooled", or rejected. Know Your Meme also has a forum section, blog, and shop. Dr. Sean Rintel, who wrote The Automated Identity blog, described Know Your Meme as "lucrative, self-supporting research that blends the humorous and the serious." As of March 2019, the site is maintained by seven editorial staff members (Don Caldwell, Adam Downer, Matt Schimkowitz, Briana Milman, Sophie Dickinson and Philipp Kachalin) and one developer (Mike Schwab) in conjunction with a group of dedicated moderators. Former staff researchers include Chris Menning, Amanda Brennan, Molly Horan and Ari Spool.

== Reception ==
Know Your Meme has been praised by numerous publications. Its entries are frequently cited in both journalism and scholarly works covering internet memes. The Daily Dot and The Wall Street Journal described the site as "the Encyclopedia Britannica" of memes and internet culture. Time included Know Your Meme on its list of the "50 Best Websites 2009" for the web series.

Know Your Meme won a Streamy Award in 2010 for Best Guest Star in a Web Series. It won the People's Voice Webby Award in the Blog-Cultural category in 2012. In June 2014, Know Your Meme was inducted into the Web Archiving Program of American Folklife Center at the Library of Congress. In May 2016, the website was cited as a source for explaining the concept of "dank memes" in regards to the political campaigning in the Australian federal election during a discussion on the ABC television programme Insiders.

== See also ==
- Cheezburger
- Cracked.com
- Den of Geek
- Fail Blog
- I Can Has Cheezburger?
- Lurkmore
- Something Awful
- Uncyclopedia
- Urban Dictionary
- List of Internet phenomena
