= List of stage names: H =

This list of stage names lists names used by those in the entertainment industry, alphabetically by their stage name's surname (or the best approximation) followed by the given name (or the best approximation) where the surname begins with "H". One-word stage names are presented in List of one-word stage names.

Stage name	Birth name	Life	Notability	Notes
Eva Hache	Eva María Hernández Villegas	1971–	Spanish choreographer, comedian, actress and television hostess	
Buddy Hackett	Leonard Hacker	1924–2003	American comedian and actor	
Reed Hadley	Reed Herring	1911–1974	American actor	
Albert Hague	Albert Marcuse	1920–2001	German–born American songwriter and actor	
Sid Haig	Sidney Eddie Mosesian	1939–2019	American actor	
Connie Haines	Yvonne Marie Antoinette JaMais	1921–2008	American singer and actress	
Alan Hale Jr.	Alan Hale MacKahan	1921–1990	American actor and restaurateur	
Alan Hale Sr.	Rufus Edward MacKahan	1892–1950	American actor and director	
Creighton Hale	Patrick Wills Fitzgerald	1882–1965	Irish-American actor	Also known as Pat Creighton Hale
Elvi Hale	Patricia Elvira Hake	1931–2025	English retired actress	
Jean Hale	Carol Jane Hale	1938–2021	American actress	
Jonathan Hale	Jonathan Hatley	1891–1966	Canadian-American actor	
Monte Hale	Samuel Buren Ely	1919–2009	American actor and country musician	
Daryl Hall	Daryl Franklin Hohl	1946–	American musician	
Jon Hall	Charles Felix Locher	1915–1979	American actor	
Lena Hall	Celina Consuela Gabriella Carvajal	1980–	American actress and singer	
Monty Hall	Monte Halparin	1921–2017	Canadian-American radio and television personality	
Ruth Hall	Ruth Gloria Blasco Ibáñez	1910–2003	American actress	
Neil Hallett	John Neil	1924–2004	Belgian-English actor	
Sleepy Hallow	Tegan Chambers	1999–	Jamaican-American rapper	
Johnny Hallyday	Jean-Philippe Léo Smet	1943–2017	French singer and actor	
Brett Halsey	Charles Hand	1933–	American actor	
Julie Halston	Julie Abatelli	1954–	American actress and comedienne	
Gerald Hamer	Geoffrey Watton	1886–1972	Welsh actor	
Kim Hamilton	Dorothy Mae Aiken	1932–2013	American actress	
Russ Hamilton	Ronald Hulme	1932–2008	English singer and songwriter	
MC Hammer	Stanley Burrell	1962–	American rapper	
Will Hammer	William Hinds	1887–1957	English studio executive	
Kay Hammond	Dorothy Standing	1909–1980	English actress	
Bruce Hampton	Gustav Berglund III	1947–2017	American musician (Hampton Grease Band)	
Cochin Haneefa	Salim Ghoush	1951–2010	Indian, actor, film director and screenwriter	
Roger Hanin	Roger Lévy	1925–2015	French actor	
Big Bank Hank	Henry Jackson	1956–2014	American rapper (The Sugarhill Gang)	Also known as Imp the Dimp
Laurence Hanray	Lawrence Henry Jacobs	1874–1947	English actor	
Setsuko Hara	Masae Aida	1920–2015	Japanese actress	
Yip Harburg	Isidore Hochberg	1896–1981	American lyricist and librettist	
Max Hardcore	Paul Little	1956–2023	American pornographic actor, producer and director	
Theodore Hardeen	Ferenc Dezső Weisz	1876–1945	Hungarian-American magician	
Ty Hardin	Orison Whipple Hungerford Jr.	1930–2017	American actor	
Ann Harding	Dorothy Walton Gatley	1902–1981	American actress	
Sarah Harding	Sarah Hardman	1981–2021	English singer, model and actress (Girls Aloud)	
John Hare	John Fairs	1844–1921	English actor and director	
Tsui Hark	Tsui Man-kong	1951–	Hong Kong film director, producer and screenwriter	
Leo Harlem	Leonardo González Feliz	1962–	Spanish comedian and actor	
Steve Harley	Stephen Malcolm Ronald Nice	1951–2024	English singer and songwriter (Cockney Rebel)	
Renny Harlin	Renny Lauri Mauritz Harjola	1959–	Finnish film director, producer and screenwriter	
Larry Harmon	Lawrence Weiss	1925–2008	American entertainer	
Ralf Harolde	Ralph Harold Wigger	1899–1974	American actor	
Charlie Harper	David Charles Perez	1944–	English singer (U.K. Subs)	
Slim Harpo	Isiah Moore or James Isaac Moore	1924–1970	American blues musician	
Kid Harpoon	Thomas Edward Percy Hull	1982–	English singer, songwriter, musician and record producer	
Calvin Harris	Adam Richard Wiles	1984–	Scottish DJ, record producer, singer and songwriter	
Jonathan Harris	Jonathan Charasuchin	1914–2002	American character actor	
Marcia Harris	Lena Hill	1868–1947	American actress	
Marion Harris	Mary Harrison	1896–1944	American singer	
Robert H. Harris	Robert H. Hurwitz	1911–1981	American character actor	
Tiny Harris	Tameka Dianne Cottle	1975–	American singer-songwriter (Xscape)	
Bobby Hart	Robert Harshman	1939–2025	American singer-songwriter (Boyce and Hart)	
Mary Hart	Mary Harum	1950–	American television personality and actress	
Mickey Hart	Michael Hartman	1943–	American musician (Grateful Dead)	
Susan Hart	Susan Neidhart	1941–	American actress	
Eden Hartford	Edna Marie Higgins	1930–1983	American actress	
Nina Hartley	Marie Hartman	1959–	American pornographic actress	
Gretchen Hartman	Grace Barrett	1897–1979	American actress	Also known as Greta Arbin, Sonia Markova, Greta Hartman
Sumi Haru	Mildred Sevilla	1939–2014	American actress	
John Harvey	John Harvey Johnson Jr.	1917–1970	American actor	
Laurence Harvey	Zvi Mosheh Skikne	1928–1973	Lithuanian actor	
Cheb Hasni	Hasni Chakroun	1968–1994	Algerian singer	
James Haven	James Haven Voight	1973–	American actor	
June Haver	Beverly Stovenour	1926–2005	American actress, singer and dancer	
June Havoc	Ellen Hovick	1912–2010	American actress and dancer	
Davey Havok	David Marchand	1975–	American singer and musician (AFI)	
Big Hawk	John Edward Hawkins	1969–2006	American rapper (Screwed Up Click)	Also known as H.A.W.K., Hawk and Five Star General of the Screwed Up Click
Jeremy Hawk	Cedric Lange	1918–2002	English character actor	
Nick Hawk	Nicholas Haas	1981–	American actor	
John Hawkes	John Perkins	1959–	American actor	
Michael Hawkins	Thomas Slater	1938–2022	American retired actor	
Tony Hawks	Antony Hawksworth	1960–	English comedian and actor	
Peggy Hayama	Shigeko Mori	1933–2017	Japanese singer	
Melissa Hayden	Mildred Herman	1923–2006	Canadian ballerina	
Julie Haydon	Donella Donaldson	1910–1994	American actress	
Billie Hayes	Billie Brosch	1924–2021	American actress	
Helen Hayes	Helen Hayes Brown	1900–1993	American actress	
Margaret Hayes	Florette Ottenheimer	1913–1977	American actress	
Melvyn Hayes	Melvyn Hyams	1935–	English actor	
Peter Hayes	Joseph Lind	1976–	American musician (Black Rebel Motorcycle Club)	
Johnny Haymer	Haymer Flieg	1920–1989	American actor	
Roberta Haynes	Roberta Schack	1927–2019	American actress	
Susan Hayward	Edythe Marrenner	1917–1975	American actress	
Thomas Hayward	Thomas Tibbett	1917–1995	American opera singer	
Jonathan Haze	Jack Schachter	1929–2024	American actor	
Hy Hazell	Hyacinth Hazel O'Higgins	1919–1970	English actress	
Johnny Hazzard	Frankie Valenti	Unknown	American former pornographic actor	
DJ Head	Kevin Bell	1971–	American hip-hop producer and DJ	
Ted Healy	Earnest Nash	1896–1937	American actor and comedian	
Ann Hearn	Ann Simons	1953–	American actress	
Rick Hearst	Richard Herbst	1965–	American actor	
Busty Heart	Susan Sykes	1961–	American television personality and actress	
Erin Heatherton	Erin Heather Bubley	1989–	American model	
Hex Hector	Héctor Ortiz	Unknown	American music producer and remixer	
Jerry Heil	Yana Oleksandrivna Shemaieva	1995–	Ukrainian singer, songwriter and YouTuber	
Brian Helicopter	Gareth Holder	1958–	English musician (The Shapes)	
Richard Hell	Richard Meyers	1949–	American singer, songwriter, musician and writer (Richard Hell and the Voidoids)	
Brigitte Helm	Brigitte Schittenhelm	1906–1996	German actress	
Buck Henry	Henry Zuckerman	1930–2020	American actor, screenwriter and director	
Gloria Henry	Gloria McEniry	1923–2021	American actress	
Pat Henry	Patrick Henry Scarnato	1924–1982	American comedian	
Thomas Henty	Thomas Cooper	1956–1988	English actor	
Audrey Hepburn	Audrey Ruston	1929–1993	British actress	
Charles Herbert	Charles Herbert Saperstein	1948–2015	American child actor	
Holmes Herbert	Horace Jenner	1882–1956	English character actor	
John Herbert	John Herbert Buckup	1929–2011	Brazilian actor, director and producer	
Black Herman	Benjamin Rucker	1889–1934	American magician	
Corinne Hermès	Corinne Miller	1961–	French singer	
Leonard Hermes	Cirio Santiago	1936–2008	Filipino film producer, director and writer	
Roy Herrick	Roy Herring	1936–1988	English actor	
Barbara Hershey	Barbara Herzstein	1948–	American actress	
Hanna Hertelendy	Ilona Zimka	1919–2008	Hungarian-American actress	
Irene Hervey	Beulah Irene Herwick	1909–1998	American actress	
Sherrie Hewson	Sherrie Hutchison	1950–	English actress	
Anne Heywood	Violet Joan Pretty	1931–2023	English actress	
Craig Hill	Craig Hill Fowler	1926–2014	American actor	
Harry Hill	Matthew Hall	1964–	English comedian, actor and writer	
Jonah Hill	Jonah Hill Feldstein	1983–	American actor	
Steven Hill	Solomon Krakovsky	1922–2016	American actor	
Thelma Hill	Thelma Hillerman	1906–1938	American actress and comedienne	
Ronnie Hilton	Adrian Hill	1926–2001	English singer	
Alexis HK	Alexis Djoshkounian	1974–	French singer-songwriter	
Fred Ho	Fred Wei-Han Houn	1957–2014	American jazz musician, composer, bandleader, playwright, writer and activist	
Rose Hobart	Rose Kefer	1906–2000	American actress	
Joy Hodges	Frances Eloise Hodges	1915–2003	American singer and actress	
Dennis Hoey	Samuel Hyams	1893–1960	English actor	
Brooke Hogan	Brooke Bollea	1988–	American television personality, singer and actress	
Nick Hogan	Nicholas Bollea	1990–	American television personality	
Fay Holden	Dorothy Fay Hammerton	1893–1973	English-American actress	
Frankie J. Holden	Peter Brian	1952–	Australian singer and actor (Ol' 55)	
Joyce Holden	Jo-Ann Heckert	1930–2022	American actress	
Stanley Holden	Stanley Walker	1928–2007	English-American ballet dancer	
William Holden	William Beedles Jr.	1918–1981	American actor	
Billie Holiday	Eleanora Fagan	1915–1959	American jazz singer	
Hope Holiday	Hope Zee	1930–	American actress	
Tony Holiday	Rolf Knigge	1951–1990	German singer	
Dexter Holland	Bryan Holland	1965–	American musician (The Offspring)	
Diane Holland	June Diane Neeltje	1930–2009	English actress and dancer	
Deidre Holland	Martine Smit	1966–	Dutch pornographic actress	
Xaviera Hollander	Vera de Vries	1943–	Dutch author	
Judy Holliday	Judith Tuvim	1921–1965	American actress and comedienne	
Frigyes Hollósi	Frigyes Weininger	1941–2012	Hungarian actor	
Hanya Holm	Johanna Eckert	1893–1992	German-American dancer and choreographer	
Libby Holman	Elizabeth Holzman	1904–1971	American socialite, actress, singer and activist	
Rupert Holmes	David Goldstein	1947–	English-American composer, singer-songwriter, playwright and author	
Stuart Holmes	Joseph Liebchen	1884–1971	American actor	Also known as Stewart Holmes
Georgia Holt	Jackie Jean Crouch	1926–2022	American singer-songwriter, actress and model	
Sandrine Holt	Sandrine Vanessa Ho	1972–	English-Canadian model and actress	
Average Homeboy	Denny Hazen	Unknown	American rapper and actor	
Nancy Honeytree	Nancy Honigbaum	1952–	American musician	
Peter Hook	Peter Woodhead	1956–	English musician (Joy Division and New Order)	
Linda Hopkins	Melinda Mathews	1924–2017	American actress and singer	
Robert Hossein	Robert Hosseinoff	1927–2020	French actor	
MC HotDog	Yao Zhongren	1978–	Taiwanese rapper	
Harry Houdini	Erik Weisz	1874–1926	Hungarian-American magician	
Rufus Hound	Robert Simpson	1979–	English actor and comedian	
Tim Howar	Timothy Hawryluk	1969–	Canadian-English actor and singer (Mike and the Mechanics)	
Curly Howard	Jerome Horwitz	1903–1952	American comedian and actor (The Three Stooges)	
Jean Howard	Ernestine Mahoney	1910–2000	American actress and professional photographer	
John Howard	John Cox Jr.	1913–1995	American actor	
Moe Howard	Moses Horwitz	1897–1975	American comedian and actor (The Three Stooges)	
Rance Howard	Harold Rance Beckenholdt	1928–2017	American actor	
Shemp Howard	Samuel Horwitz	1895–1955	American comedian and actor (The Three Stooges)	
Susan Howard	Jeri Mooney	1944–	American actress, writer and activist	
James Wong Howe	Tung-Jim Wong	1899–1976	Chinese-American cinematographer	
Thirstin Howl III	Victor DeJesus	Unknown	American rapper	
John Hoyt	John Hoysradt	1905–1991	American actor	
Harold Huber	Harold Huberman	1909–1959	American actor	
Rock Hudson	Roy Harold Scherer Jr.	1925–1985	American actor	Later known as Roy Harold Fitzgerald after being adopted by his stepfather
Jon Huertas	Jonathan William Scott Hofstedt	1969–	American actor	
Jack Hues	Jeremy Ryder	1954–	English singer, songwriter and musician (Wang Chung)	
Kathleen Hughes	Elizabeth von Gerkan	1928–	American actress	
Engelbert Humperdinck	Arnold Dorsey	1936–	British singer	
Sammo Hung	Kam-Po Hung	1952–	Hong Kong actor, martial artist, film producer and director	
La Húngara	Sonia María Priego Bárbara	1980–	Spanish flamenco singer	
Jeffrey Hunter	Henry McKinnies Jr.	1926–1969	American actor and producer	
Kim Hunter	Janet Cole	1922–2002	American actress	
Ross Hunter	Martin Fuss	1920–1996	American film and television producer and actor	
Tab Hunter	Arthur Kelm	1931–2018	American actor	
Al Hurricane	Alberto Nelson-Sanchez	1936–2017	American singer-songwriter	
Christopher Hurst	Christopher Hugh Peyton John	1956–	Zimbabwean-British actor	
Mike Hurst	Michael John Longhurst Pickworth	1942–	English musician and record producer	
Zakir Hussain	Zakir Hussain Qureshi	1951–	Indian composer, musician, music producer and actor	
Will Hutchins	Marshall Hutchason	1930–	American actor	
Betty Hutton	Elizabeth Thornburg	1921–2007	American actress, comedienne and singer	
Ina Ray Hutton	Odessa Cowan	1916–1984	American singer and bandleader	
Marion Hutton	Marion Thornburg	1919–1987	American singer and actress	
Craig Huxley	Craig Hundley	1954–	American actor, inventor and musician	
Parthenon Huxley	Richard Willett Miller	1956–2026	American musician	
Paul Hyde	Paul Nelson	1955–	English-Canadian singer-songwriter (Payolas)	
Diana Hyland	Joan Diana Gentner	1936–1977	American actress	
