= Mememolly =

Canadian British Internet personality

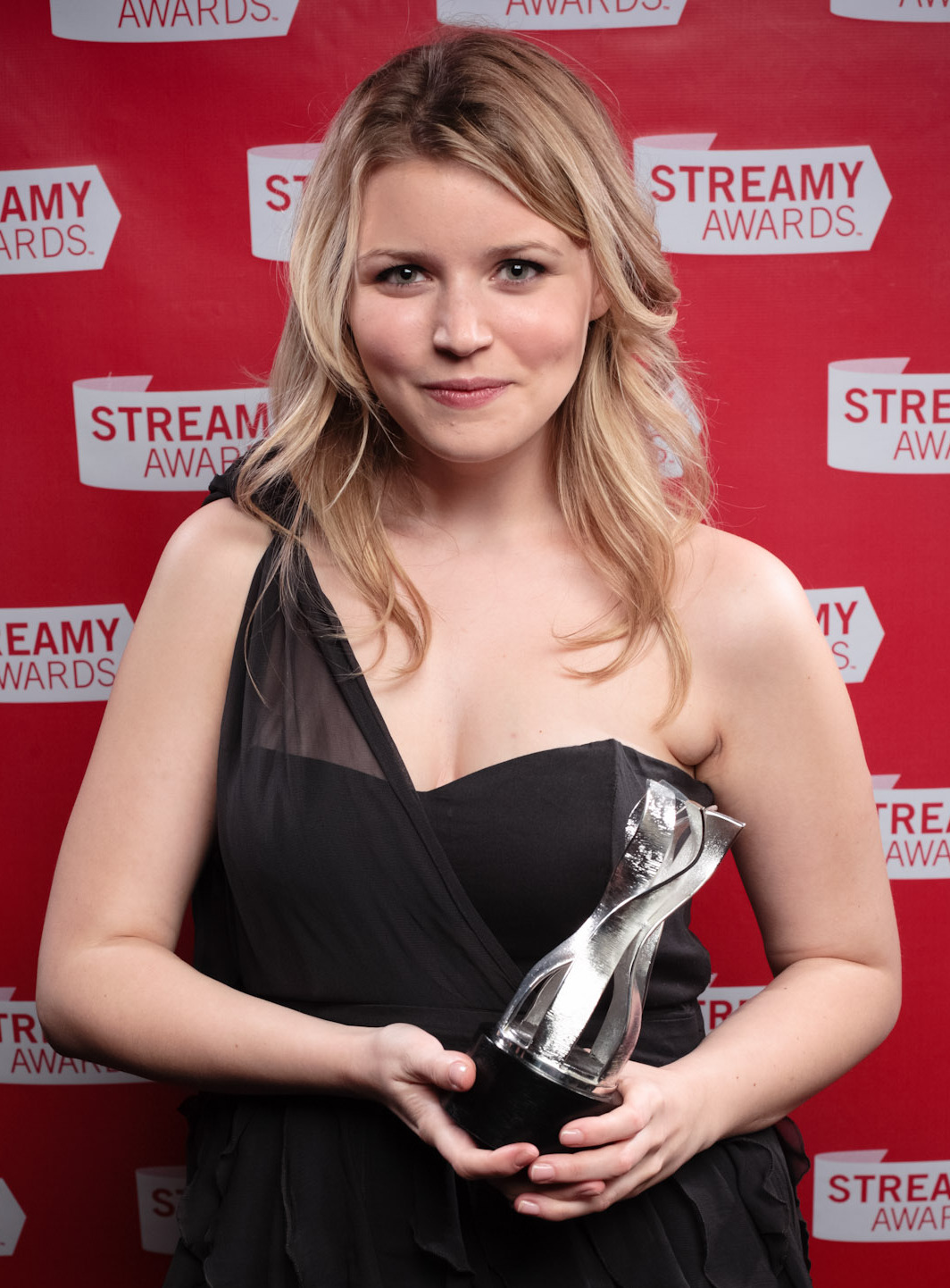
- Molly Templeton at the Streamy Awards 2010
- Born: 25 October 1989 (age 36); Beaconsfield, England
- Years active: 2006–present
- Known for: Vlogging, Rocketboom
- Spouse: Mike Rugnetta (m. 2017)

YouTube information
- Channel: mememolly
- Genre: Vlogs
- Subscribers: 97.3 thousand
- Views: 48.5 million
- Last updated: 23 Apr 2026

Molly Templeton (born 25 October 1989), known by her stage name Mememolly (me-me-molly), is a British-Canadian Internet personality and entrepreneur. She hosted the video blog Rocketboom from July 2009 to July 2011.

== Career ==
Originally from the United Kingdom, Templeton started making YouTube videos in her bedroom when she was 16. After a few years working independently in web video and studying fine art at Emily Carr University of Art and Design in Vancouver, she went to New York to host, write and produce for the comedic news web show, Rocketboom. In July 2011 she left Rocketboom and was employed by the online entertainment studio My Damn Channel as Director of Talent & Audience Development, later cofounding the internet marketing agency Everybody at Once. Since October 2019, Templeton has worked for YouTube as the Head of Social Marketing, Operations, & Global Crisis Response.

Templeton's mememolly channel on YouTube was once No. 10 on the all-time most-subscribed list for the UK. As of December 2020, the channel has over hundred thousand subscribers and 48 million video views, and has been inactive since 2013.

== Personal life ==
Templeton was born and raised in Beaconsfield, England. Since July 2017, she is married to American composer and educational YouTuber Mike Rugnetta. As of 2019, the couple live in an apartment in Brooklyn, New York. She has collaborated with him several times on his podcasts, as an interviewee on Reasonably Sound and as a performer on Fun City.

Templeton is an avid cyclist, and has misophonia (an extreme aversion to, but not a fear of, certain sounds).

Although ceasing to make YouTube videos in 2013 and largely dropping out of the public eye, Templeton maintains a following on other social media platforms, including Twitter and Instagram.

== See also ==
- List of YouTube personalities
