= Amanda Congdon =

American former video blogger

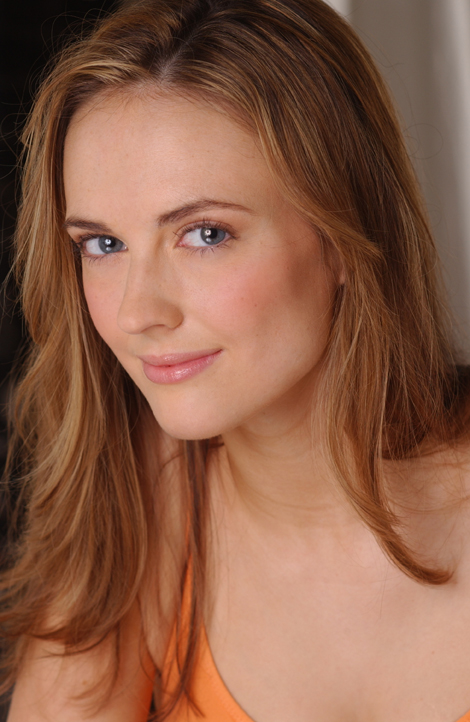
- Amanda Congdon promo shot
- Born: Amanda Thornton Congdon; August 4, 1981 (age 45); New York City, U.S.
- Known for: Video blogging
- Notable work: Rocketboom

Amanda Thornton Congdon (born August 4, 1981, in New York City) is an American former video blogger. She began her on-screen career as the first anchor of the online daily news show Rocketboom which she hosted and produced until June 23, 2006.

== Involvement with Rocketboom ==
Congdon began as Rocketboom's anchor with the show's October 26, 2004, debut.

The show went from an initial 700 viewers in 2004 to 70,000 viewers in the first ten months. BusinessWeek labeled it "the most popular site of its kind on the Net". More viewers visited Rocketboom after a June 11, 2006, interview with Congdon on CNN. Rocketboom's audience continued to increase, going from 100,000 vlog viewers at the end of 2005 to 300,000 by the spring of 2006.

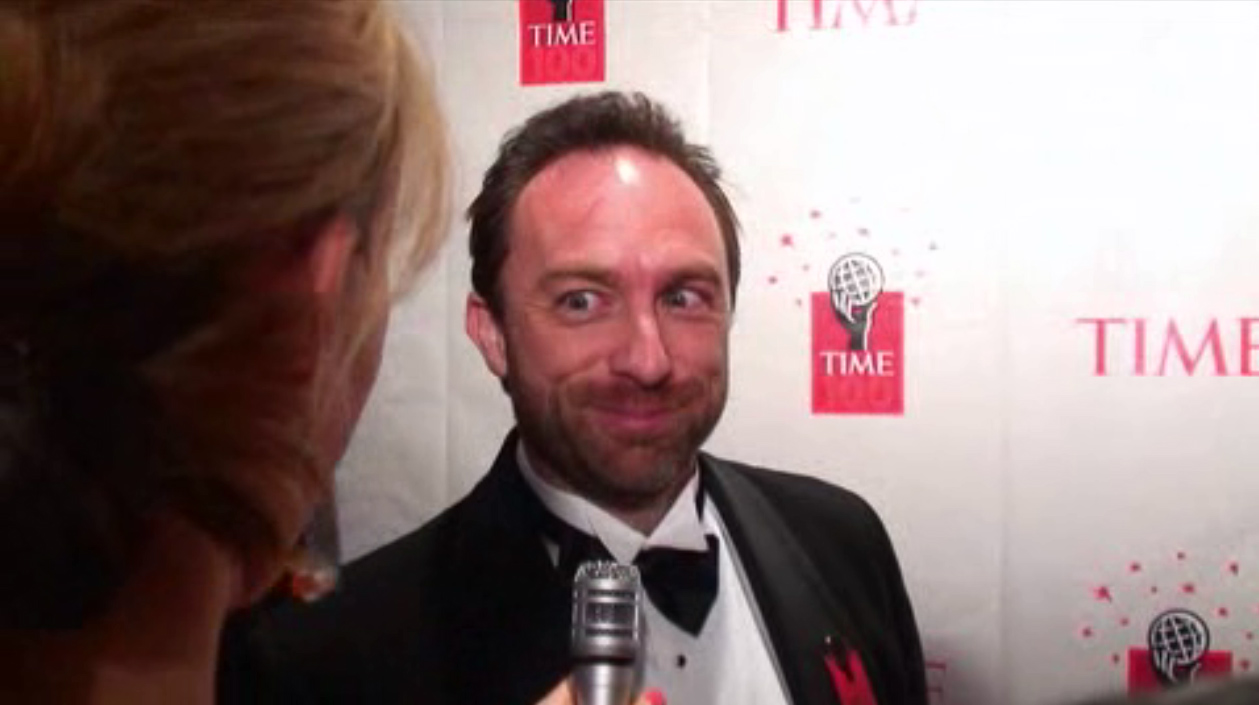
Congdon interviewing Jimmy Wales at the Time 100 Most Influential People Gala, 2006

On July 5, 2006, Congdon released a video statement on her blog, announcing her departure from the show. Andrew Baron, majority stakeholder of Rocketboom, stated she was leaving the show to "pursue opportunities ... in Hollywood" and Joanne Colan stepped in as Congdon's replacement. Congdon claims that she was fired.

== Amanda Across America ==
Congdon's first endeavor after Rocketboom was AmandaAcrossAmerica.com, a blog based on Congdon's travels through America in a hybrid vehicle. The journey took a circuitous route with stops in New York, Connecticut, New Jersey, Pennsylvania, North Carolina, Tennessee, Washington, D.C., Missouri, Wisconsin, Arizona and California.

Now living in California, Congdon and her husband, Mario Librandi, opened a restaurant called Vegan Mario's. The restaurant serves vegan food for lunch daily, upon which Congdon initially planned to create a website series.
