= Star Wars Uncut =

- Directed by: Casey Pugh
- Produced by: Annelise Pruitt; Casey Pugh; Chad Pugh; Jamie Wilkinson
- Release date: August 2010
- Running time: 124 minutes
- Country: United States
- Language: English

Star Wars Uncut is a 2010 online tribute film produced, edited and directed by Casey Pugh. It is a shot-for-shot recreation of the 1977 film Star Wars consisting of 473 fifteen-second segments created and submitted from a variety of participants. The full film was made available on YouTube in August 2010 for free distribution. Several clips from the film were used in the 2010 documentary The People vs. George Lucas.

== Production ==
In July 2009, Pugh created a website where fans could sign up to recreate specific 15-second scenes from the Star Wars film. Multiple submissions were submitted for each scene, and votes were held to determine which ones would be added to the final film. Although the scenes reflect the dialogue and imagery of the original film, each scene is created in a separate distinct style, such as live-action, animation and stop-motion.

Many of the sequences are filmed in deliberately crude, low-budget or otherwise comical manners, and the actors do not always resemble the original cast. One scene is a stop-motion sequence using Lego Star Wars figurines. Another mimics the animation style of the 1968 Beatles film Yellow Submarine. Others are parodies of specific pop culture subgenres, such as anime and exploitation films. Star Wars Pez candy dispensers are featured prominently in some scenes.

Annelise Pruitt was the designer of the Star Wars Uncut website. Jamie Wilkinson worked as developer and Chad Pugh as designer.

On October 10, 2014, the sequel, Empire Uncut, was released on the official Star Wars YouTube channel.

== Reception ==
Star Wars Uncut won a Primetime Emmy Award for Outstanding Achievement in Interactive Media on August 21, 2010. The producers were encouraged to submit it to the awards by Richard Cardran, a past Emmy winner and member of the National Academy of Television Arts and Sciences. Pruitt, Wilkinson, Casey Pugh and Chad Pugh each received an Emmy award. They also received a 2021 Co-Creation Peabody Award.
