= Average Homeboy =

American internet personality

Average Homeboy (also known as Denny Blaze and Denny Blazin Hazen) is the creation and alter ego of Cleveland-based AV artist Denny Hazen.

Hazen (as Blazin Hazen, a self-proclaimed "Suburban White Rapper") was the subject of a circa-1989 video demo tape that mysteriously appeared on YouTube in 2005, and achieved viral video status in a relatively short time.

"Average Homeboy" polarized viewers and critics, who were divided between praising the inherent entertainment value of a sincere, clean-cut teenager in 1980s attire attempting to rap, and denouncing the excesses of the era, absurdity of the rap, and ineptitude of its star, yet it garnered the attention of several prominent news and infotainment entities, including Time and VH1, as well as men's culture magazine Complex, which, in a 2011 article, included it in its list of the 100 Best Viral Videos of the 2000s.

== Background ==
Hazen, with the aid of self-purchased synthesizers and AV equipment, recorded, filmed, and edited "Average Homeboy", then sent a VHS copy to MTV, who reportedly shelved it in the same storage area as the thousands of other self-submitted recordings they had received, over the years. Hazen's video has been described as having been created around 1989, but a 1991 calendar appears in the video. In 2005, the video was uploaded to YouTube by 'K-Maxx' (who claimed to be an MTV employee), and as its popularity skyrocketed, it came to the attention of Hazen who was working behind the scenes in radio and television production in the Cleveland/Akron area.

Hazen reclaimed his property, and ultimately embraced his new-found fame, reuploading "Average Homeboy" to YouTube in 2006, along with other earlier efforts "Blazin Hazen", and "Like a Seagull", and new ones such as "White as Rice", "Black Men Can't Swim", and a remixed version of "Average Homeboy".

Hazen's popularity as Blaze grew to where he received numerous invitations to attend music and internet culture-related venues and gatherings across the country, including the NY Music Festival at Madison Square Garden in 2006, ROFLCon 2008 (an internet meme convention in Cambridge, Massachusetts, where he appeared with other live musical acts of similar origin, including Group X, Leslie Hall, Lemon Demon, and Trocadero), He has been a fixture on various internet culture programs, both on television and online, including CollegeHumor, G4 TV's Attack Of The Show, and Tosh.0 (as the subject of one of Daniel Tosh's 'Web Redemptions').

== Present day ==
On March 8, 2014, Hazen posted a documentary short on his alter ego's origins and journey to internet fame.

== See also ==
- List of YouTube celebrities
