= Jamie Wilkinson =

Internet researcher

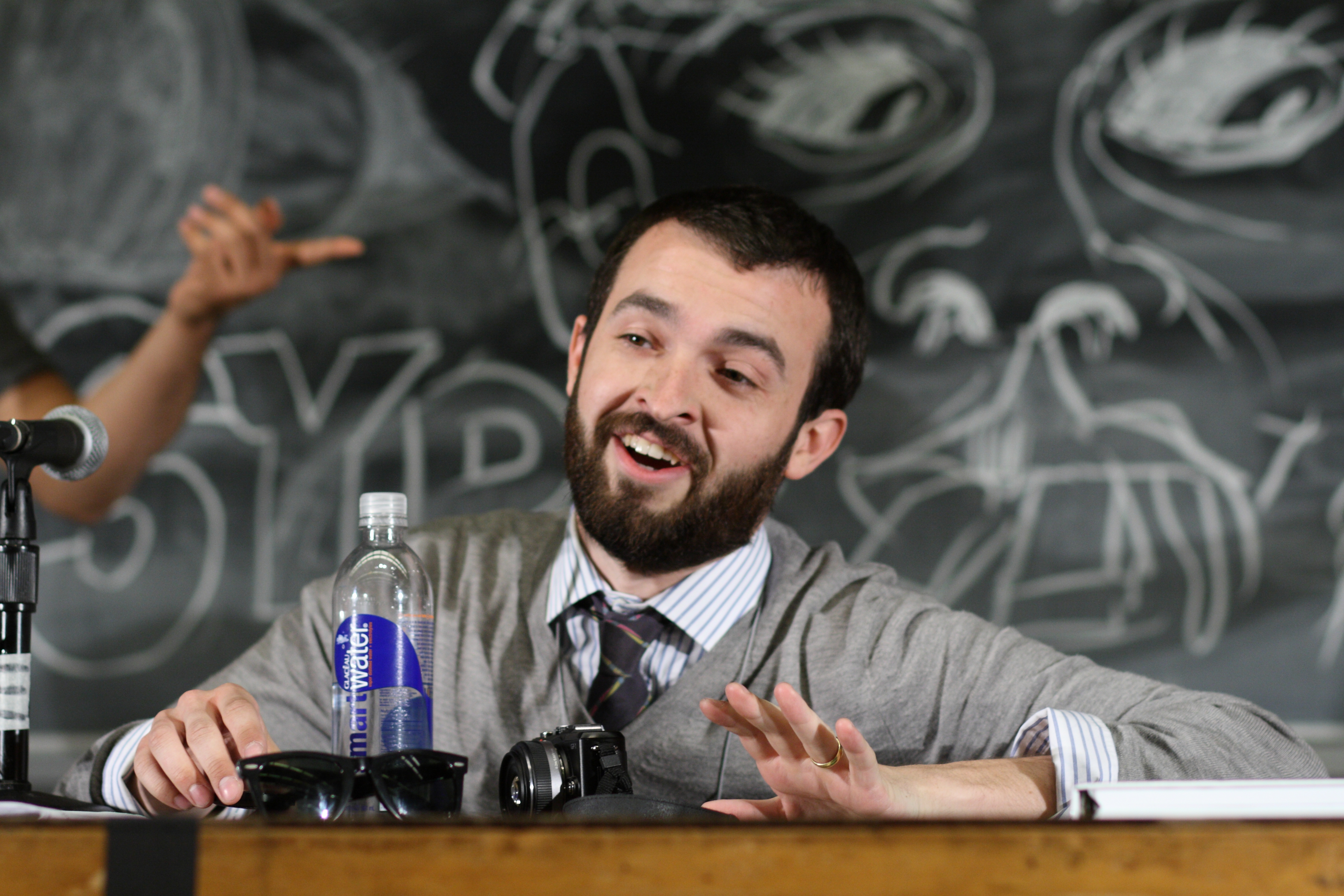
- Known for: programming, startups, Internet culture, digital art, net art
- Notable work: Know Your Meme, VHX, Star Wars Uncut, Free Art and Technology Lab

Jamie Wilkinson is an internet culture researcher and software engineer. Wilkinson started Know Your Meme, a database of viral internet memes while working at Rocketboom in New York City. Wilkinson also co-founded VHX, a digital distribution platform targeting independent filmmakers, which was acquired by Vimeo in May 2016.

== Career ==
Wilkinson is a virtual research fellow of the Free Art and Technology Lab. His work was featured in F.A.T. Gold: Five Years of Free Art & Technology, a retrospective of F.A.T. Lab's work, at Eyebeam, MU Eindhoven, and Gray Area Foundation for the Arts. He also co-founded video sharing and payment platform VHX. Wilkinson was Eyebeam's systems administrator in 2006.

In August 2010, Wilkinson won an Emmy for "Outstanding Creative Achievement in Interactive Media - Fiction" for his work in collaborating with Casey Pugh, Annelise Pruitt and Chad Pugh on Star Wars Uncut, a web-based platform and community where users can recreate their favorite scenes from Star Wars.

In addition to his online video work, Wilkinson taught an "Internet Famous" class at Parsons graduate Design & Technology Program that examined internet attention, specifically how it could be manipulated and aggregated via different strategies. Students’ grades were determined solely based on their ability to garner online attention in the form of web page views, video views, Twitter followers, and "favorites."
