= Joanne Colan =

British internet and television personality

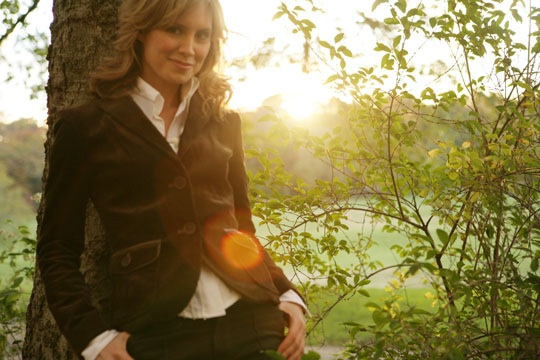
Joanne Colan in 2006

Joanne Colan is the former VJ for MTV Europe and former anchor of the vlog Rocketboom. She is an actress, known for Know Your Logic (2012), Any Given Latitude (2005), and Themes from a Rosary (2012). She was on Discovery's show Dean of Invention alongside Dean Kamen as a correspondent. She also hosted a travel adventure series and she was senior vice president and senior content strategist at Edelman New York.

== Career ==
=== Television ===
As an MTV Europe VJ from 2000 to 2004, her shows reached 124 million households in more than 50 countries and territories. She scripted, co-produced and hosted MTV News, Top 20 Countdown and MTV Movie Special. She also hosted such live international events as MTV's Winterjam, the MTV Europe Music Awards and MTV Presents. Her work on MTV's European Top 20 earned her an award for Best European Satellite Music Programme in 2001 as voted by viewers in the What Satellite UK & Europe TV Poll.

=== Internet ===
Colan began hosting Rocketboom on 12 July 2006, presenting amusing and/or informative video clips and web links from a desk in the Rocketboom studio and other New York City locations. Her departure from Rocketboom was announced on 17 April 2009.

In addition to Rocketboom, Colan was the host of the travel adventure series Any Given Latitude where she is seen trekking, climbing, sailing, scuba diving and snowmobiling. The 13-episode series, which took her to 13 countries from Austria to Vietnam, premiered on 10 April 2006, when Scripps Networks launched its Fine Living Network.

Colan was named as Senior Vice President and Senior Content Strategist at Edelman New York, on 6 May 2012. She was hired to "advance the firm’s various content initiatives and work with clients and teams to help improve their visual storytelling capabilities with an emphasis on short-form sharable video."

=== Other ===
Colan was music/DJ curator at Manhattan's now-defunct Table 50, named for Walter Winchell's table at the Stork Club. Colan commented, "Our goal is to support the exciting evolution of DJ culture and expose our guests to the artists who are shaping the music of tomorrow."

== Watch ==
- Joanne Colan in the Blue Lagoon, Iceland
- Joanne Colan in Any Given Latitude promo
