= Rocketboom =

American daily vlog

- Genre: Politics

Cast and voices
- Hosted by: Keghan Hurst (from April 23, 2012); Mememolly (July 6, 2009 – August 25, 2011); Caitlin Hill (April 2009); Joanne Colan (July 12, 2006 – April 17, 2009); Amanda Congdon (October 26, 2004 – July 5, 2006)

Publication
- Original release: October 26, 2004 – November 6, 2013

Related
- Website: www.rocketboom.com

Rocketboom was a daily vlog produced by Andrew Baron in the format of a newscast with a comedic slant. Since 2004 Rocketboom has presented oddities, vlog excerpts, social and political commentary. The Rocketboom weblog and Apollo Pony featured supplemental material unfit for the vlog.

On April 19, 2012, after an eight-month hiatus, Rocketboom introduced Keghan Hurst as their fifth host prior to their April 23 relaunch. Mememolly was the host until August 25, 2011. Joanne Colan hosted from July 12, 2006 until April 17, 2009. Caitlin Hill also hosted a few episodes in April 2009. The show was originally hosted by Amanda Congdon from October 26, 2004 until July 5, 2006.

== History ==
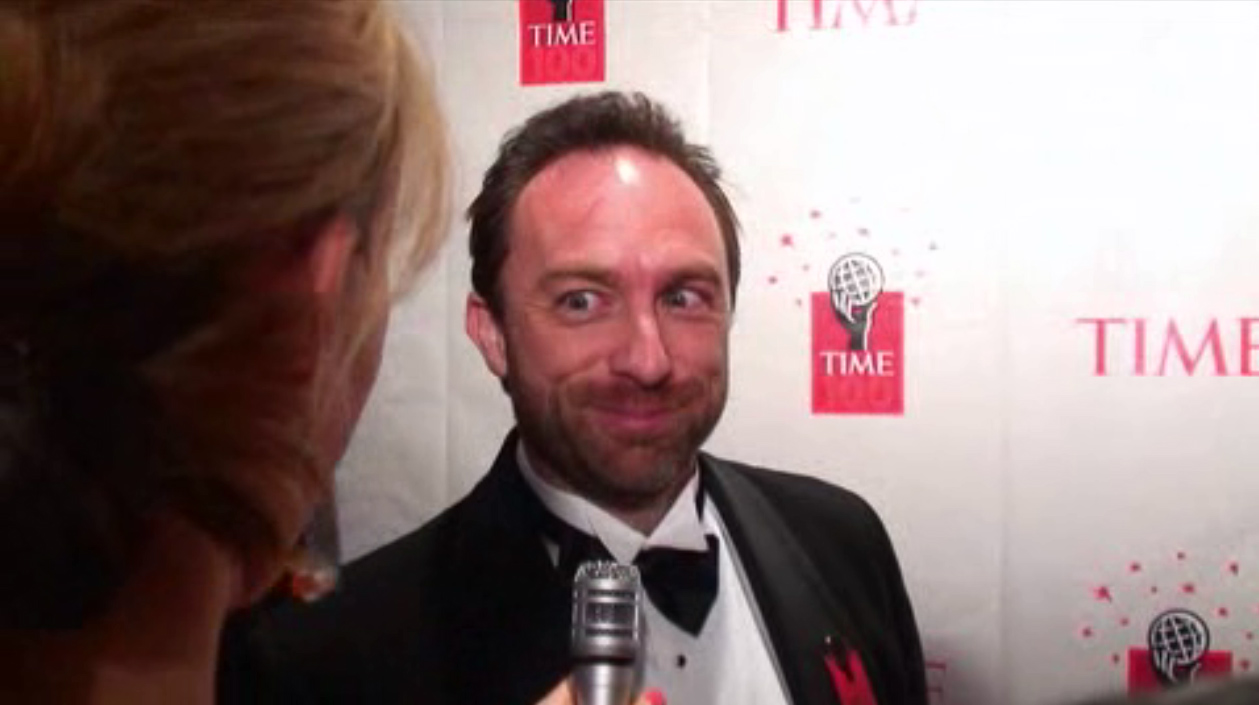
Rocketboom interviewed Jimmy Wales at the Time 100 Most Influential People Gala as of May 8, 2006 as featured on this vlog on May 9, 2006. Watch the vlog here.

Rocketboom started in October 2004 as a daily webcast staged as a mini-Newscast. By December it already had 25,000 downloads per day and growing, with its promotion depending mostly of word-of-mouth. Its revenue came from selling ad space at the end of the reports.

In its first ten months, it went from an initial 700 viewers to 70,000 viewers. The vlog's success was noted in the summer of 2005 by CBS Evening News, Wired News and other publications. BusinessWeek labeled it "the most popular site of its kind on the Net."

In October 2005 Steve Jobs from Apple, introducing the new iPod 5G's video podcast capabilities, showed a playlist of video podcasts that included Rocketboom. During Jobs' introduction of the iTV in September 2006, when discussing podcasts, host Joanne Colan was shown.

The January 9, 2006, issue of Newsweek stated that Rocketboom had "130,000 daily viewers." On February 2, 2006 Rocketboom was incorporated into an episode of the TV series CSI: Crime Scene Investigation in a fictional scene of a murderer watching a Rocketboom commentary on the crime. In the month following the CSI episode, the number of Rocketboom viewers jumped to 200,000. As noted by Dan Mitchell in the New York Times (2006-03-11), this is similar to the size of a small cable show audience. In "A Blog Writes the Obituary of TV," Mitchell wrote:

One recent week, the video blog Rocketboom drew an average of 200,000 people a day to watch its short daily news reports on technology, the arts and other topics. The Abrams Report on MSNBC, meanwhile, drew 215,000 viewers to its weekday hourlong show about legal issues. Does this anecdote -- that an unpopular cable news show and a wildly popular Web site draw similarly sized audiences -- prove that the Internet is upending the economics of the television business? It does for Prince Campbell, a former media executive who runs the Chartreuse (BETA) blog. Mr. Campbell wields superlatives in a particularly bloggish manner at chartreuse.wordpress.com. "Broadcast television is dead," he declares. "Just like the Internet killed the music industry, it's about to do the same thing to broadcast TV."

In April and May 2006, Rocketboom introduced its first commercials. The first commercial sponsors were TRM and Earthlink. Each of which was a series of 5 commercials shown, one per day, over the week that they were featured.

In Fall of 2006, Rocketboom's popularity claims and self-published statistics came into question. In an interview with Dow Jones, Baron claimed "400,000 viewers per day" and that "some episodes are more popular and receive well over a million complete downloads." After extensive analysis BusinessWeek reported that Rocketboom provided incorrect statistics data resulting in "cutting in half the original estimate... to 78,500 downloads" and noting that Rocketboom refused "to let any third party... verify these stats."

In March 2008, Compete.com named Rocketboom one of the fastest growing video startups on the internet. In August 2008, Sony Pictures Television signed a one-year distribution and advertising deal with Rocketboom for a seven-figure guarantee plus a share of future revenues generated by the show. Sony distribution would send the show across multiple digital platforms such as Crackle and its syndication network, the PS3, the PSP and Bravia Internet video link televisions. Rocketboom was also available on TiVo, iTunes, Miro, Apple TV, Pando, TVTonic and web video portals, including YouTube, Metacafe, blip.tv and Vuze. On September 13, 2010 Rocketboom was the first channel to participate in a test of YouTube's live streaming platform. A 2011 online report indicated Rocketboom was losing staff and having financial troubles.

== Personnel ==
The Rocketboom production team members included its creator Andrew Baron (writer, producer, director), Mememolly (host), Kenyatta Cheese (producer) and Leah D'Emilio. Cheese also features on-screen and produces Rocketboom's spin-off Know Your Meme.

=== Anchors ===
- Amanda Congdon - October 26, 2004 until July 5, 2006
- Joanne Colan - July 12, 2006 until April 17, 2009
- Caitlin Hill - April 2009
- Mememolly - July 2009 until August 25, 2011
- Keghan Hurst - April 23, 2012 until Nov 6, 2013

In June 2009, when Rocketboom announced it was looking for two new anchors, after not being able to reach a deal with current host Caitlin Hill, job postings for the New York position and the new Los Angeles desk sparked a heated public talent search as the positions listed a base salary of $80,000 plus a $10,000 signing bonus and 3% of ad revenues. It was believed to be the highest paid on-camera job in web television.

=== Correspondents ===
Rocketboom and Rocketboom Human Wire's World Video Report presented webcasts packaged by its correspondents in the United States, Europe and Kenya.

- Annie Tsai (Los Angeles)
- Andy Carvin (Washington, D.C.)
- Zadi Diaz (Los Angeles)
- Ella Morton (New York)
- Ruud Elmendorp (Nairobi)
- Steve Garfield (Boston)
- Milt Lee (South Dakota)
- Chuck Olsen (Minneapolis)
- Bre Pettis (Seattle)
- Tyson Root (Houston)
- Stefan M. Seydel (Switzerland/Germany/Austria)
- Graham Walker (Prague)

== Accolades ==
- Streamy Award for Best News or Politics Web Series (2009) (Nomination)

== See also ==
- Pop17
- Political podcast

== Sources ==
- Axelrod, Jim. CBS Evening News: "Eye on America" (August 19, 2005)
- Farhi, Paul. American Journalism Review: "Rocketboom!" (June–July, 2006)
- Goldstein, Andrew M. "The Rise of the Video Blog," Rolling Stone, April 21, 2006.
- Barnako, Frank: "Rocketboom May Charge for Shows" (Mar 22, 2007)
- BusinessWeek: "Splitsville at Rocketboom"
- BusinessWeek: "Rocketboom's Powerful Lift-Off"
- Chartreuse: "The BIG Problem: Why Paul Scrivens Is Smarter Than Les Moonves"
- Mediashift: Glaser, Mark. "Rocketboom Nets $80,000 After eBay Auction"
- "Interview with Baron on TUAW". tuaw.com. November 3, 2005. Archived from the original on January 16, 2006.
- Newsweek: "Right to the Top" (1/9/06)
- Robin Good interviews Baron and Congdon
