= Andrew Baron =

American vlogger (born 1970)

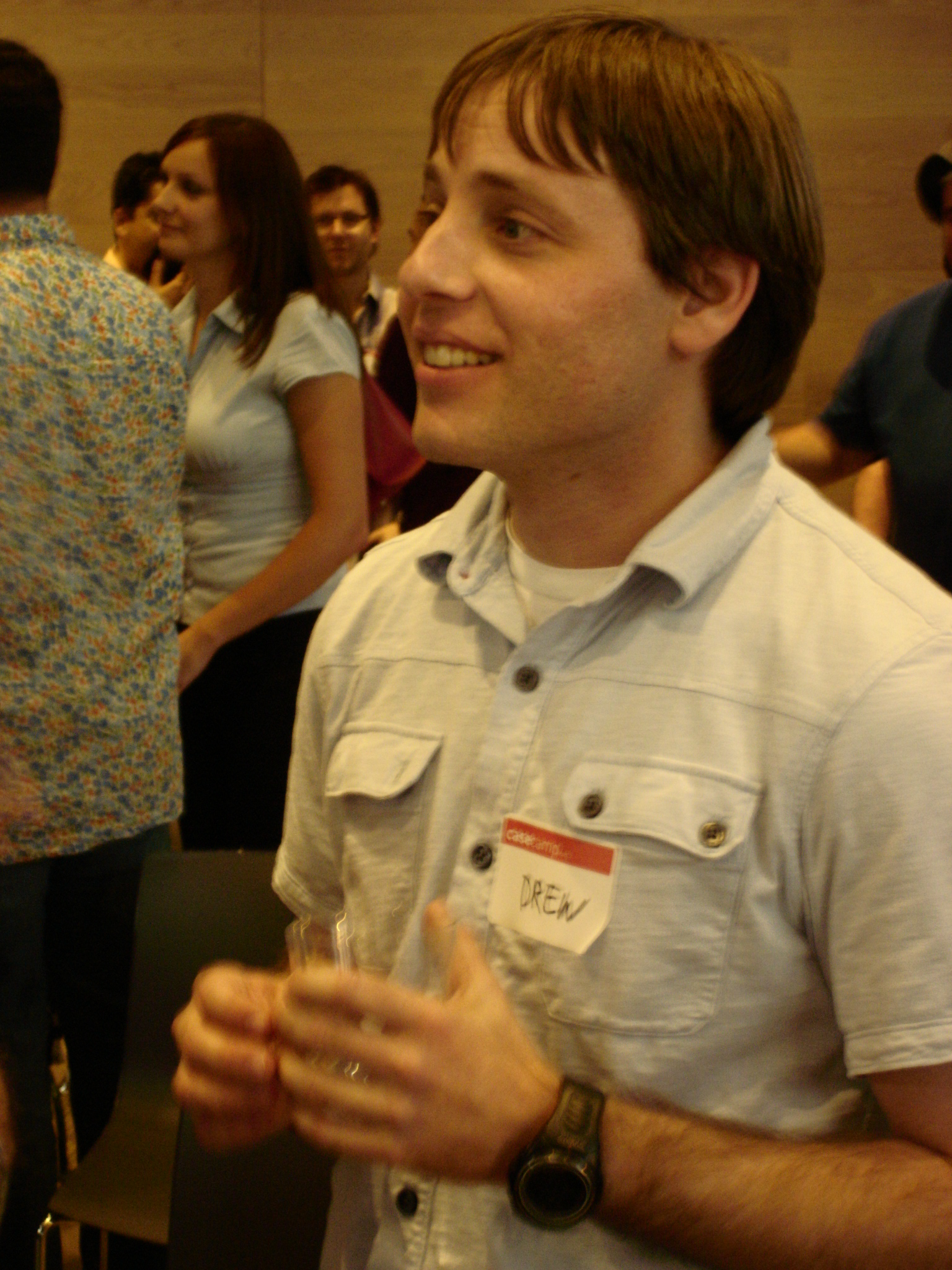
- Baron in 2006
- Born: Andrew Michael Baron; March 31, 1970 (age 56)
- Notable work: Rocketboom, Know Your Meme

Andrew Michael Baron (born 1970) is the founder of Rocketboom, video aggregator Magma, the non-profit Humanwire, and the co-founder of Know Your Meme. Baron has taught undergraduate and graduate classes at Parsons School of Design and was teaching IDTech at M.I.T. when he came up with the idea for Rocketboom.

== Early life ==
Baron holds a BA in Philosophy from Bates College and a master of Fine Arts in Design and Technology from Parsons School of Design.

== Early career ==
In 1999, Baron was the owner of a visual and performing arts gallery, Movements Gallery on 6th Street in Austin, Texas which the Austin Chronicle named 'Best New Multi-Disciplinary Space in Austin' in the 'Best of Austin's Critics Poll'.

An active music composer throughout the 1990s and early 2000s, Baron scored numerous scores for Austin-area artists, including "Mad About Harry", a film by AMFILMS awarded as a Hollywood Film Festival, 2000 finalist. He was appointed by the City of Austin Arts Commission to serve as a Mixed Arts Advisory Panelist, 2001.

== Online video ==
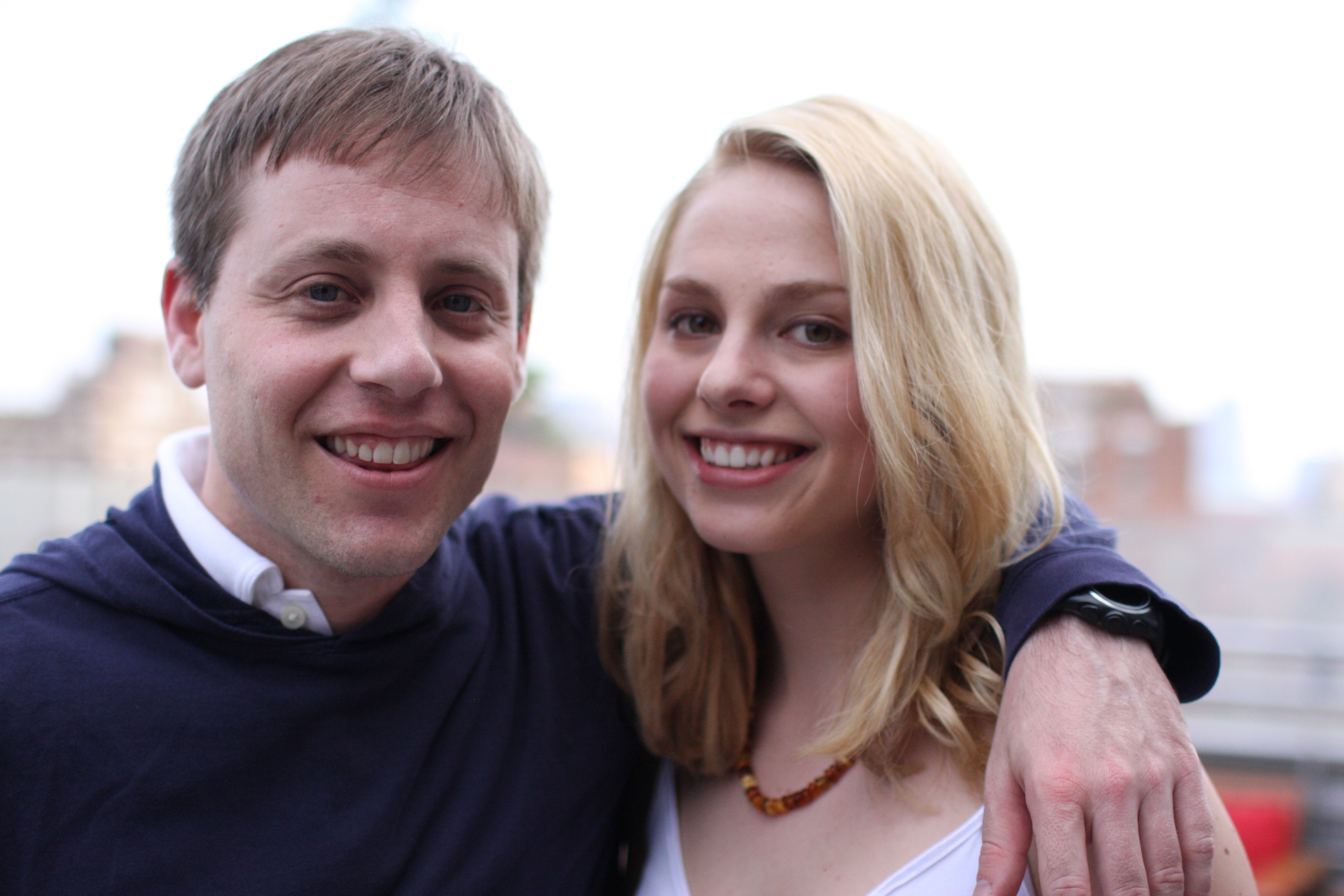
Baron with Sarah Austin in 2008

After releasing Rocketboom in late 2004, Baron established himself as one of the first vloggers and arguably one of the most influential. With Rocketboom, Baron built one of the first large audiences around a video show, and went on to generate the first large-scale advertising deals.

On August 19, 2005, Baron was interviewed on CBS Evening News. In an "Eye on America", segment CBS veteran Jim Axelrod commented on the effort at daily news coverage on a limited budget and Baron's early grasp of the next Internet wave. "You know what they call that? Vision."

Baron directed a portion of "Killer", an episode of CSI: Crime Scene Investigation which aired February 2, 2006.

Steve Jobs featured Baron's Rocketboom on stage when releasing the video iPod and again when releasing the Apple TV.

In March 2006, Baron commented on the sale of a week of advertising for $40,000 on eBay in Brandweek:

"Advertising with us has extra value because we aren't going to accept advertising from someone whose morals are against us, someone like Hummer," said Rocketboom producer Andrew Baron. The creators of the show are acting as ad agency as well as media for the ads for TRM and EarthLink. "We've got to approve the ads and if we like them, chances are our viewers will like 'em."

== Know Your Meme ==
In 2008, Baron created the first version of the Know Your Meme database, to accompany a spin-off show he created and produced for Rocketboom.

In 2011, Baron sold Know Your Meme to Cheezburger in a reported "low seven-figure deal".

== Humanwire ==
In 2015, Baron founded Humanwire, a humanitarian platform based in Boulder, Colorado, designed to connect individual donors directly with refugee families from regions including Syria, Turkey, Lebanon, Greece, and Jordan. Media coverage described the organization as enabling donors to support housing, education, medical care, and other essential needs while maintaining direct communication with recipient families.

The platform’s model emphasized direct, one-to-one relationships between donors and families, distinguishing it from traditional humanitarian aid organizations. Coverage from regional and national outlets highlighted Humanwire’s grassroots approach and its use of digital tools combined with on-the-ground workers to facilitate real-time support and communication.

Activities also included in-person educational efforts, such as the establishment of the Butterfly Effect Center, a brick-and-mortar school in Lebanon for displaced Syrian children.

In 2017, reporting by The Denver Post raised allegations of financial mismanagement, including delayed aid distributions, which led to criminal charges against Baron.

Baron disputed the charges and the reporting. Though the Denver Post coverage ended in 2017, a 2020 review by ‘‘The Principal Post’’ reported that it found no evidence that donor funds had been misappropriated and stated that “the facts do not support” earlier allegations, also noting that the criminal case had been dismissed

Baron’s case in Boulder was dismissed and sealed in January 2020 and his arrest records were removed in March, 2020.

== Meme Talks ==
In 2026, Baron developed and began touring Meme Talks, a lecture series examining the history and cultural evolution of memes, tracing their development from early forms of communication to the modern internet era.

== Awards ==
Baron's work had been recognized by the Webbys, the Vloggies and Streamys.

== Personal life ==
Andrew Baron is the son of trial lawyer Fred Baron. Andrew Baron made international news again in 2008, when he used his blog to plead with a drug company to help save his father's life.
