= Protecting agent (shipping) =

Protecting agent or protective agent or supervisory agent in shipping is the person or entity that provide shipping agency services to the shipowners, charterers, time charterers in the situations where the conflict of interests exists or anticipated from the shipping agent. The main task of the protecting agent is to protect the interest of his principal during the port call for which the shipping agent have been nominated or appointed by the party whose interest does not concur with those of the principal.

== Premises ==
A ship's port call requires an agent to handle a vast range of operations, which usually takes place at remote locations far from the ship owner's office. These operations are handled by the shipping agent on behalf of the ship owner. There could be two ways in which the shipping agents may become appointed or nominated to provide agency services. First, on the basis of the ship owner's own choice from the free agency services market. Second, on the basis of the relevant provisions of the charter party. In the latter case, it is often the charterer's condition for the particular shipping agent to be appointed and it may be dictated by various reasons, but most probably – by the reason of close business relationships between the two. Also, local port regulations may leave no choice for the parties but to appoint a certain agent.

External videos
- [https://www.youtube.com/watch?v=56NCZzUHh6k&feature=youtu.be&t=1350 FONASBA and BIMCO joint webinar, General Agency Appointment agreement, YouTube video

A shipping agent may be a part of the bigger stevedoring business that holds the contract with the charterer or shipper or simply be a "pocket agency" affiliated with the charterer. Such agent is commonly referred to as the charterer's agent. Shippers may also insist on the particular agent to handle the port call when negotiating the sale contract. Whatever the background is, the charterer's agent will keep the loyalty to the party that generates business for such agent despite the fact that ship owner continues to be his principal.

== Tasks ==
Unless specifically indicated in the appointment or instructions from principal, the protecting agent has no defined tasks, but rather supervises the tasks carried out by the shipping agent. All the tasks of the protecting agent are the mirror of the shipping agent's ones, which were not performed or anticipated to be not performed properly.

- Checking disbursement proforma for the port dues and fees to be correct and competitive.
- Advising the principal on the vessel actual turnover and providing any other useful information.
- Providing ship husbandry services: crew changes, medical care, etc.
- Verifying Statement of Facts and time sheet entries.
- Signing Bill of lading on behalf of the master and releasing it according to the instructions.
- Looking after the third parties that provide services to the principal: ship chandlers, suppliers.
- Assisting in the disputes that arise during the port call and after departure.
- Arranging for the ship surveys and P&I correspondents attendance, legal services.
- Participating in the accident and incident investigation.
- Fulfilling any other tasks on the request from the principal.

== Legal aspects ==
An agency relationship constitutes a fiduciary duty owed to the principal by the shipping agent and include the duty to act in accordance with the principal instructions, duty of loyalty, duty not to make secret profits, and duty of confidentiality. Despite this fact the shipping agent may breach this duty for the reason of the conflict of interests. Although the agent is liable for such a breach, in practice this is almost impossible for the principal to succeed in a court action because of many factors: foreign jurisdiction (a jurisdiction of the agent's residence), the lack of evidence and local rules knowledge as well as the factor of the time passed after the breach. The only defence against this situation or in case when the principal have no faith in the charterer agent is to appoint a protecting agent.

== Fees and funding ==
Similarly to the shipping agent fees, protecting agent will charge the agency fee that may be either state regulated and thus fixed or negotiable. It is common practice to have a protecting agency fee as much as 50% of the full agency fee. The principal may also choose to pay his port disbursement invoices through the protecting agent by placing him in funds and the latter shall release such funds to the shipping agent only after checking for the relevant items correctness.

== See also ==
- Conflict of interests
- Agency (law)
- Shipping agency
- Disbursement
