= Shipbroking =

Financial service, which forms part of the global shipping industry

Shipbroking is a financial service, which forms part of the global shipping industry. Shipbrokers are specialist intermediaries/negotiators (i.e. brokers) between shipowners and charterers who use ships to transport cargo, or between buyers and sellers of vessels.

== History ==
In the 19th century, it was the work of ship-brokers to procure goods on freight or a charter for ships outward bound. They also went through the formalities of entering and clearing vessels at the customs-house. They collected the freight on vessels brought into port and took an active hand in the management of all business matters between ship-owners and merchants, whether shippers or consignees, for which they were paid a fee. In major British ports, ship-brokers were also usually insurance-brokers.

== Modern shipbroking ==
Some brokerage firms have developed into large companies, incorporating departments specialising in shipping's various sectors, e.g. Dry Cargo Chartering, Tanker Chartering, Container Chartering, Sale & Purchase, Demolition, Futures and Research; other "boutique" shipbroking firms concentrate on specific sectors of the shipping market.

The principal shipping and shipbroking centres worldwide are London, New York City, Singapore, and Tokyo, as well as where many shipowners are based such as Oslo and Athens. Other places continue to develop in international shipping services, such as Hong Kong and Shanghai, Delhi and Mumbai, Copenhagen, Geneva, Genoa, Hamburg and Paris in Europe; and in North America, Connecticut, Houston, and Montreal are important shipbroking centres.

Until the late 20th century, it was commonplace for shipbrokers to cover more than one discipline, although nowadays the vast majority of shipbrokers specialize in a specific sector. Like many financial services, historically shipbroking grew out of the City coffee houses, becoming established at the Baltic Exchange; among its most famous members being Ernest Simpson, ex-husband of The Duchess of Windsor (died 1972), and Alderman the Lord Mountevans.

The Institute of Chartered Shipbrokers sets educational standards throughout the industry worldwide, whose Fellows are accorded the privilege of using the post-nominal letters FICS.

== Sale and purchase ==
Sale & Purchase ("S&P") brokers handle the buying and selling of existing vessels in the secondhand market or contract new ships (called newbuildings in industry parlance) from shipbuilding yards. S&P brokers promote opportunities and discuss market trends with shipowners, charterers, investors and bankers, as well as reporting on market sales, vessel values, market trends and activity. When a shipowner has a vessel to sell or is looking for a vessel to acquire, the shipbroker will scour the market for buyers, or for suitable sales candidates, discuss with potential counterparties or their broker the main points of the sale transaction and eventually negotiate all of the details, usually based on a standard contract. During such proceedings, shipbrokers not only negotiate the price of the vessel on behalf of their principals but also all the logistical details for the transfer of the title and the vessel itself to the buyers (new owners), including the banking arrangements. During any negotiation, minor disputes may occur, which are to be handled in accordance with market fluctuation, i.e. the market may be moving in favor of the buyer (vessel price is softening) or in favor of the seller (vessel price is strengthening) giving each party a potential reason to cancel the transaction. When shipbrokers act on behalf of passive investors or financial buyers, they may also have to find time charter employment for the vessel and assist with practical arrangements such as the appointment of ship managers. Some S&P brokers specialize in the sale of ships for scrap, requiring a different set of skills and contacts.

== Dry cargo broking ==
Dry Cargo brokers are typically specialists in the chartering of Bulk carriers, and are engaged to act either for a shipowner looking for employment for a ship, or a charterer with a cargo to be shipped. Dry Cargo brokers maintain large databases of vessel positions, cargoes, and rates, paying constant attention to the direction of the markets so as to advise their clients accurately as to how to maximize profits or minimize expenses. Dry Cargo shipping can, in general terms, be categorized by Vessel size: namely, Bulkers such as Capesizes, Panamaxes, and Handysize. Each size of vessel suits different types of cargo and trade routes/ports. Many owners, charterers, and brokers tend to specialize in one or other of these sectors.

== Tanker broking ==
Tanker brokers specialize in the chartering of tankers, which requires a different set of skills, knowledge and contacts from dry cargo broking. Tanker brokers may specialize in crude oil, gas, oil products or chemical tankers. Tanker brokers similarly negotiate maritime contracts, known as charter parties. The main terms of negotiation are freight/hire and demurrage.

Oil being a fast moving trade, freight rates for crude oil tanker charters are most commonly based on the Worldscale Index; the Worldscale Association publishes flat rates annually.

For some specific voyages, such as named voyages (i.e. from A to B) and for specialist ships, like LNG tankers (a highly specialized sector of the tanker market), freight rates can be agreed on a lumpsum (or dollar per ton) fixed rate between both parties.

== Container vessel broking ==
Container brokers specialize in the chartering of container ships and provide container shipowners and charterers with market-related information and opportunities.

== Futures broking ==
Shipping Futures brokers specialise in negotiating maritime futures contracts.

== See also ==
- Worshipful Company of Shipwrights
- Baltic Exchange
- Category: Shipbroking companies

== Sources ==
- Wood, Philip (2006). Tanker Chartering. London: Witherby's. ISBN 978-1856092838.
- Huber, Mark (2001). "Ch. 9: Chartering and Operations". Tanker operations: a handbook for the person-in-charge (PIC). Cambridge, MD: Cornell Maritime Press. ISBN 0-87033-528-6.
- Turpin, Edward A.; McEwen, William A. (1980). "Ch. 18: United States Navigation Laws and Ship's Business". Merchant Marine Officers' Handbook. Centreville, MD: Cornell Maritime Press. ISBN 0-87033-056-X.
