= Cargo ship =

Ship or vessel that carries goods and materials

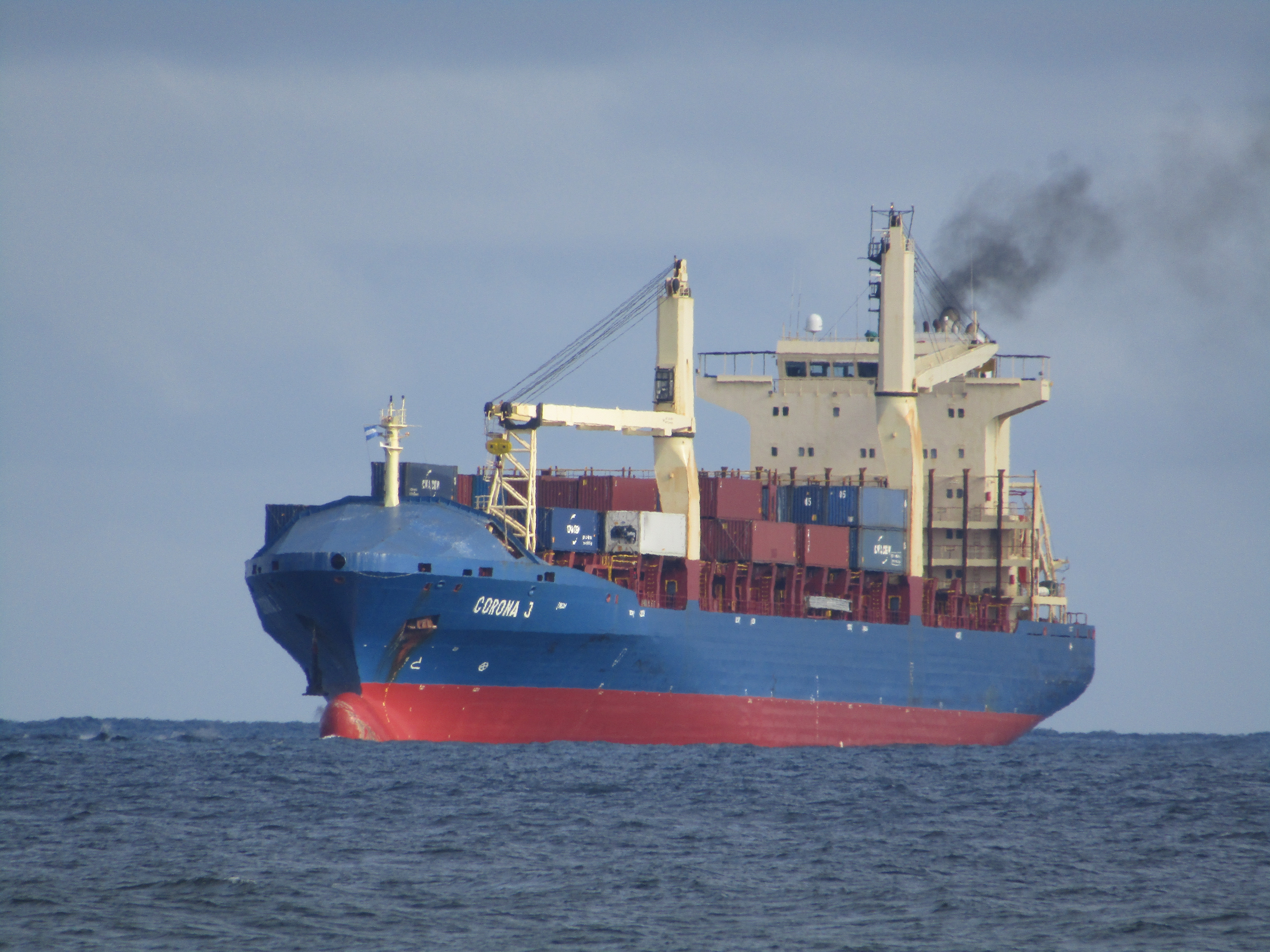
Cargo ship at Puerto Cortés in Honduras.

A cargo ship or freighter is a merchant ship designed to transport goods, commodities, and materials across seas and oceans to help others, or to ship to stores. These ships form the backbone of international trade, carrying the majority of global freight by volume. Cargo ships vary widely in size and configuration, ranging from small coastal vessels to massive ocean-going carriers, and are typically specialized for particular types of cargo, such as containers, bulk goods, or liquids. Modern cargo ships are constructed from welded steel and equipped with loading mechanisms such as cranes or gantries, however, old ones were wood, other than that. They operate under complex logistical networks and international regulations, playing a critical role in the global economy and maritime infrastructure.

== Definitions ==
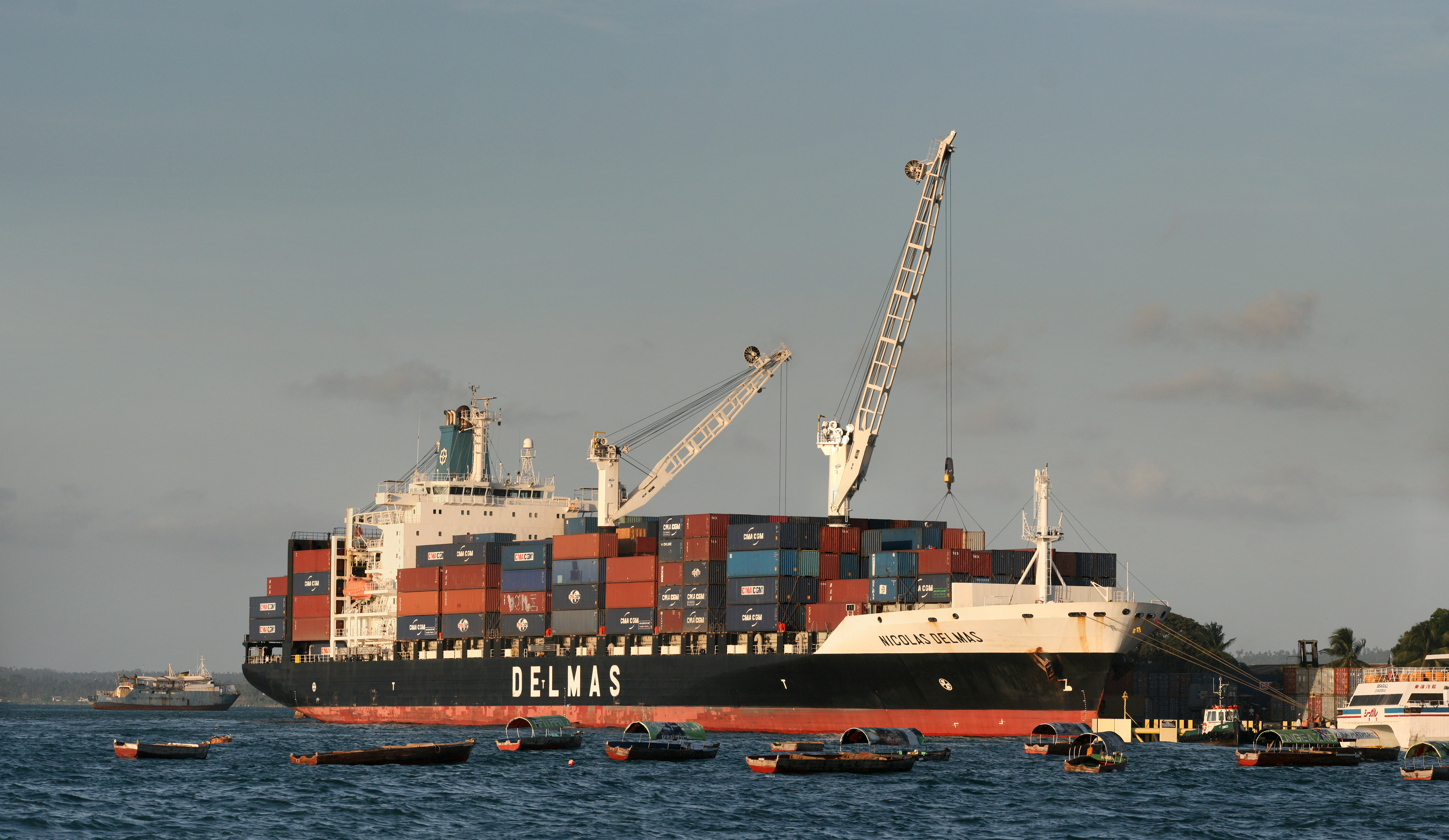
container ship unloading at a port in Zanzibar, Tanzania

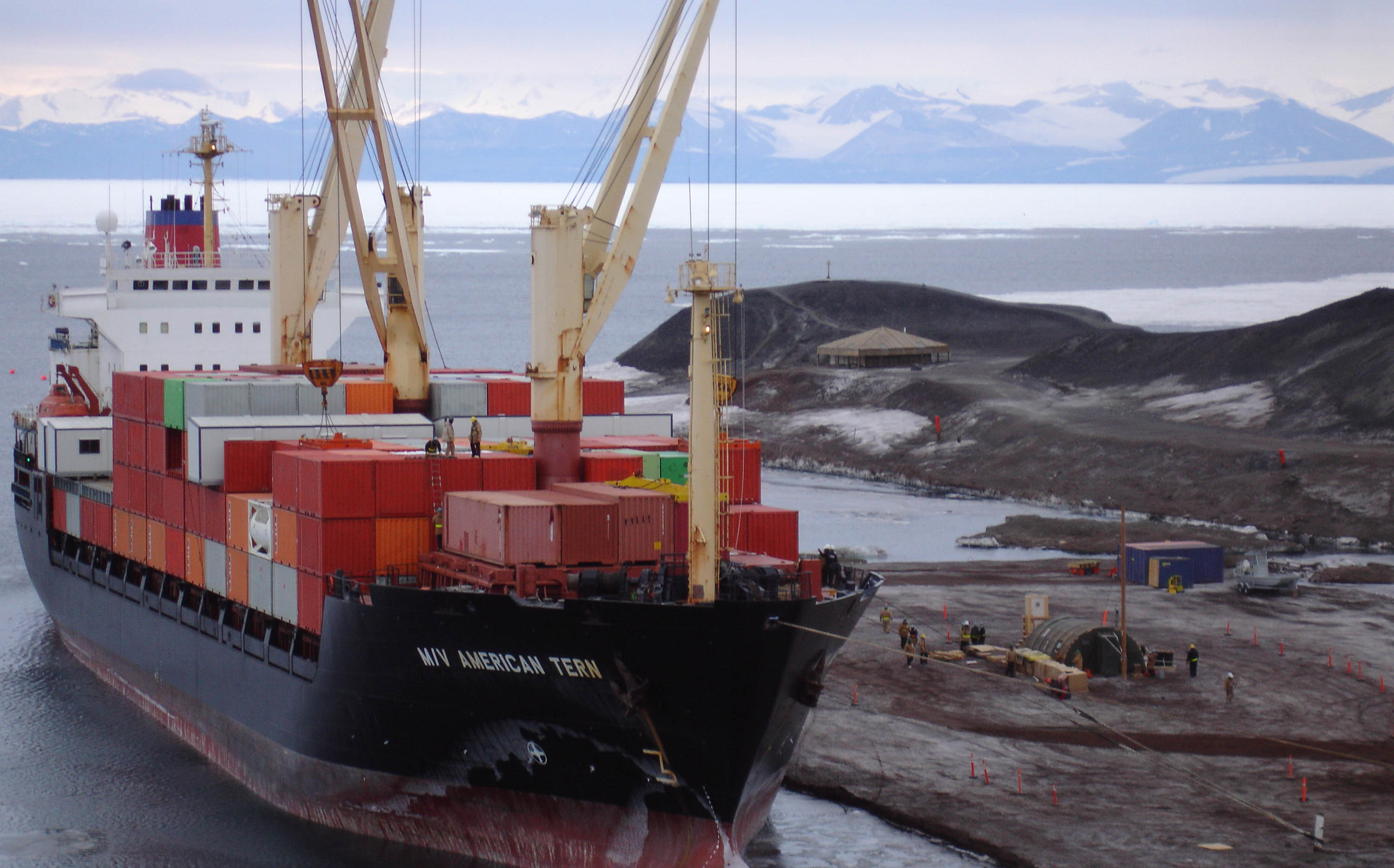
US cargo ship off McMurdo Station, Antarctica

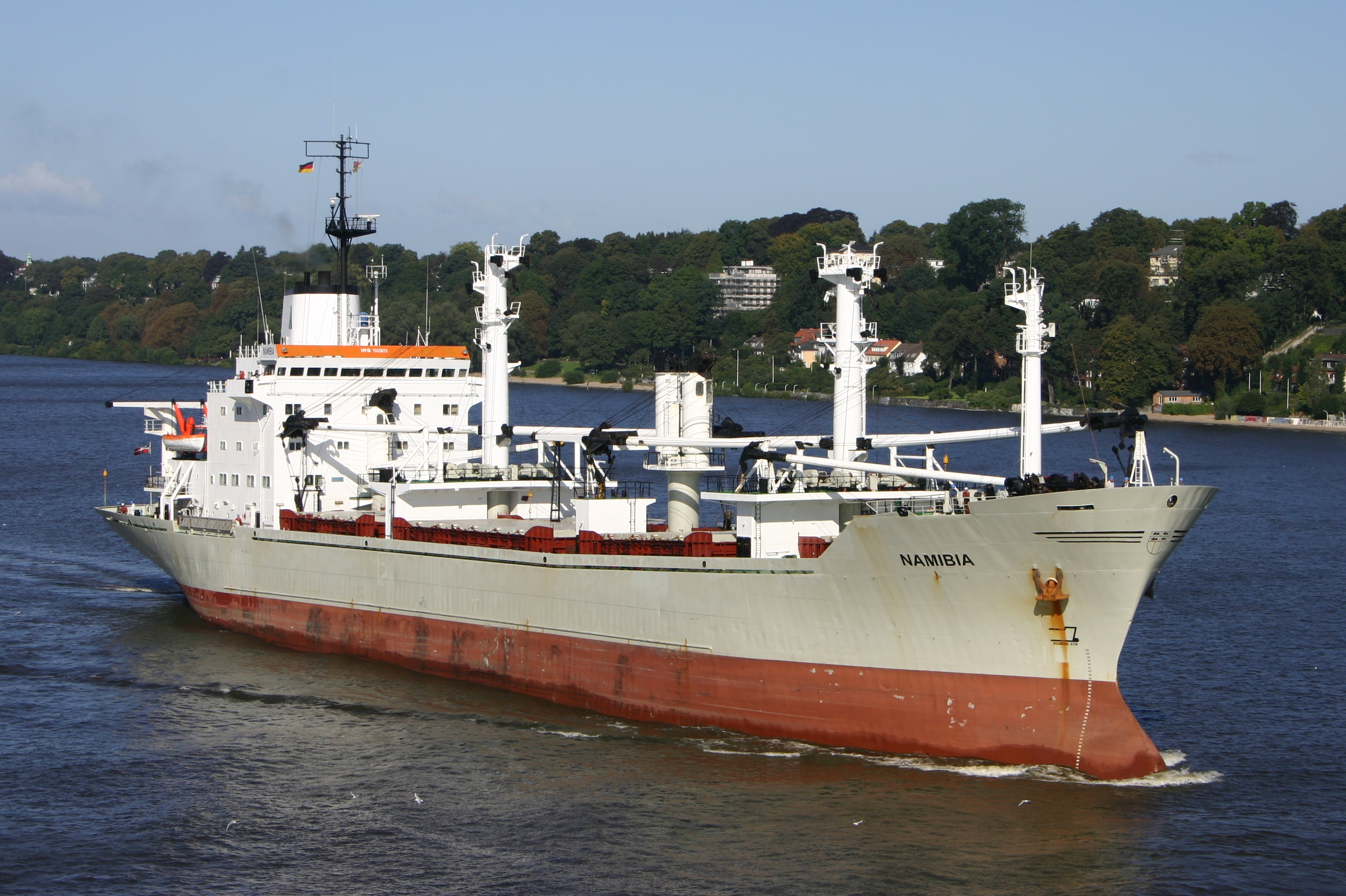
cargo ship Namibia

The words cargo and freight have become interchangeable in casual usage. Technically, "cargo" refers to the goods carried aboard the ship for hire, while "freight" refers to the act of carrying of such cargo, but the terms have been used interchangeably for centuries.

Generally, the modern ocean shipping business is divided into two classes:

1. Liner service: typically (but not exclusively) container vessels (wherein "general cargo" is carried in 20-or-40-foot (6.1 or 12.2 m) containers), operating as "common carriers", calling at a regularly published schedule of ports. A common carrier refers to a regulated service where any member of the public may book cargo for shipment, according to long-established and internationally agreed rules.
2. Tramp-tanker business: generally this is private business arranged between the shipper and receiver and facilitated by the vessel owners or operators, who offer their vessels for hire to carry bulk (dry or liquid) or break bulk (cargoes with individually handled pieces) to any suitable port(s) in the world, according to a specifically drawn contract, called a charter party.

Larger cargo ships are generally operated by shipping lines: companies that specialize in the handling of cargo in general. Smaller vessels, such as coasters, are often owned by their operators.

=== Classification of cargo ships ===
Cargo ships, also known as freighters, are classified according to the nature of the cargo they are designed to transport. Major categories include:

- Feeder vessels or feeder ships are medium-size freight ships. In general, a feeder means a seagoing vessel with an average capacity of 300 to 1000 twenty-foot equivalent units (TEU). Feeders collect shipping containers from different ports and transport them to central container terminals where they are loaded to bigger vessels, or for further transport into the hub port's hinterland. In that way the smaller vessels feed the larger liners, which carry thousands of containers.
- Break-bulk, breakbulk, or break bulk cargo, also called general cargo, are goods that are stowed on board ships in individually counted units. Traditionally, the large numbers of items are recorded on distinct bills of lading that list them by different product. This is in contrast to cargo stowed in modern intermodal containers as well as bulk cargo, which goes directly, unpackaged and in large quantities, into a ship's hold(s), measured by volume or weight (for instance, oil or grain).
- A container ship (also called boxship or spelled containership) is a cargo ship that carries all of its load in truck-size intermodal containers, in a technique called containerization. Container ships are a common means of commercial intermodal freight transport and now carry most seagoing non-bulk cargo.
- A tanker (or tank ship or tankship) is a ship designed to transport or store liquids or gases in bulk. Major types of tanker ship include the oil tanker (or petroleum tanker), the chemical tanker, cargo ships, and a gas carrier. Tankers also carry commodities such as vegetable oils, citrus juice, molasses, and wine.
- A bulk carrier or bulker is a merchant ship specially designed to transport unpackaged bulk cargo, typically grain, coal, ore, forest products, steel coils, or cement, in its cargo holds.
- A multi-purpose vessel (MPV) is a seagoing ship that is built for the carriage of a wide range of cargoes. Examples of these cargoes are: wood, steel, building materials, rolls of paper and bulk cargo.
- A refrigerated cargo ship, also known as a reefer ship, is a refrigerated cargo ship typically used to transport perishable cargo, which require temperature-controlled handling, such as fruits, meat, vegetables, dairy products, and similar items.
- Roll-on/roll-off (RORO or ro-ro) ships are cargo ships designed specifically to transport wheeled cargo, such as cars, motorcycles, trucks, semi-trailer trucks, buses, trailers and railroad cars, which are moved directly onto and off the ship by their own wheels or on a platform vehicle such as a self-propelled modular transporter. This is in contrast to lift-on/lift-off (LoLo) vessels, which rely on cranes to load and unload cargo.
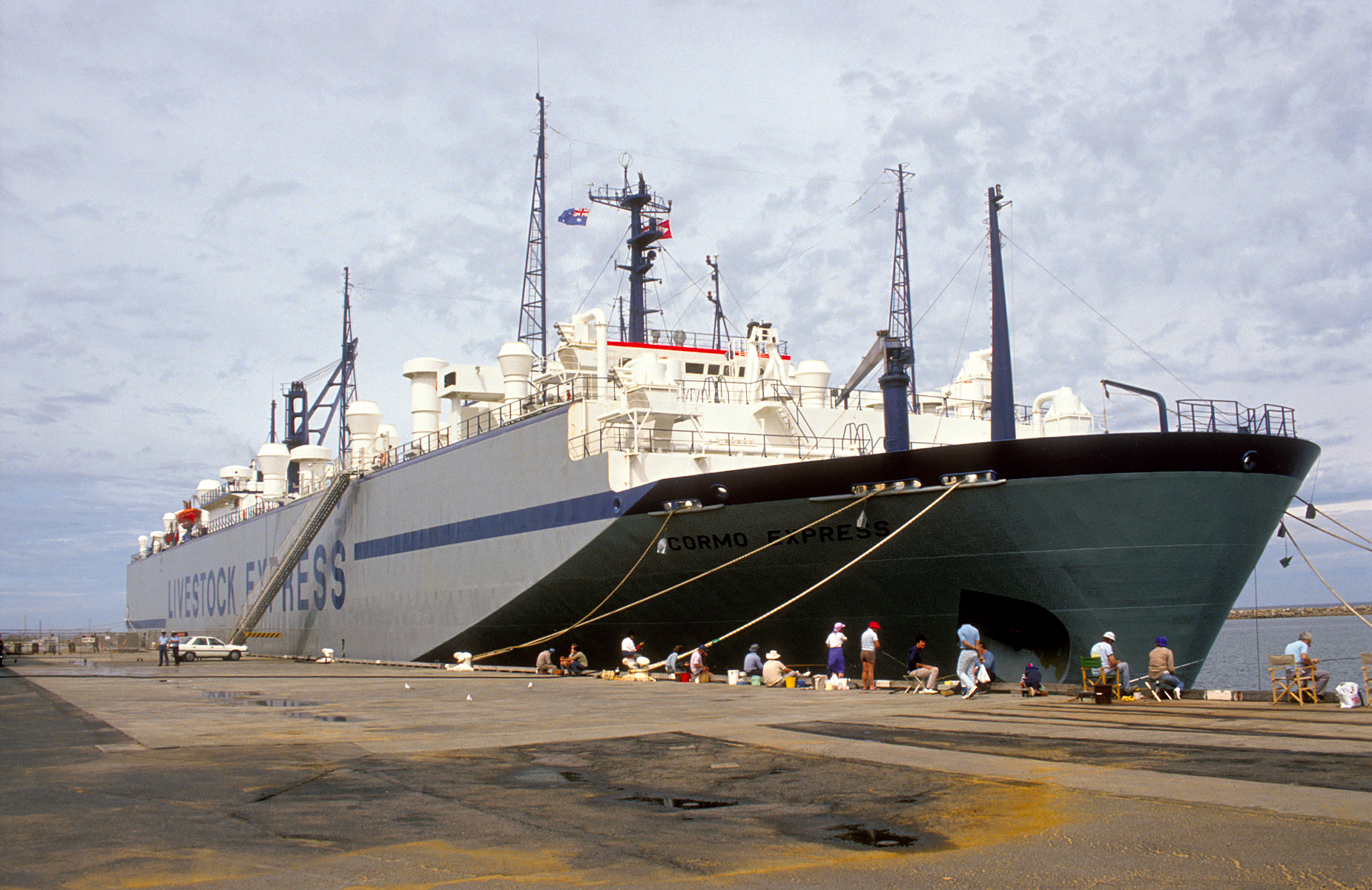
- Livestock Carrier-ship
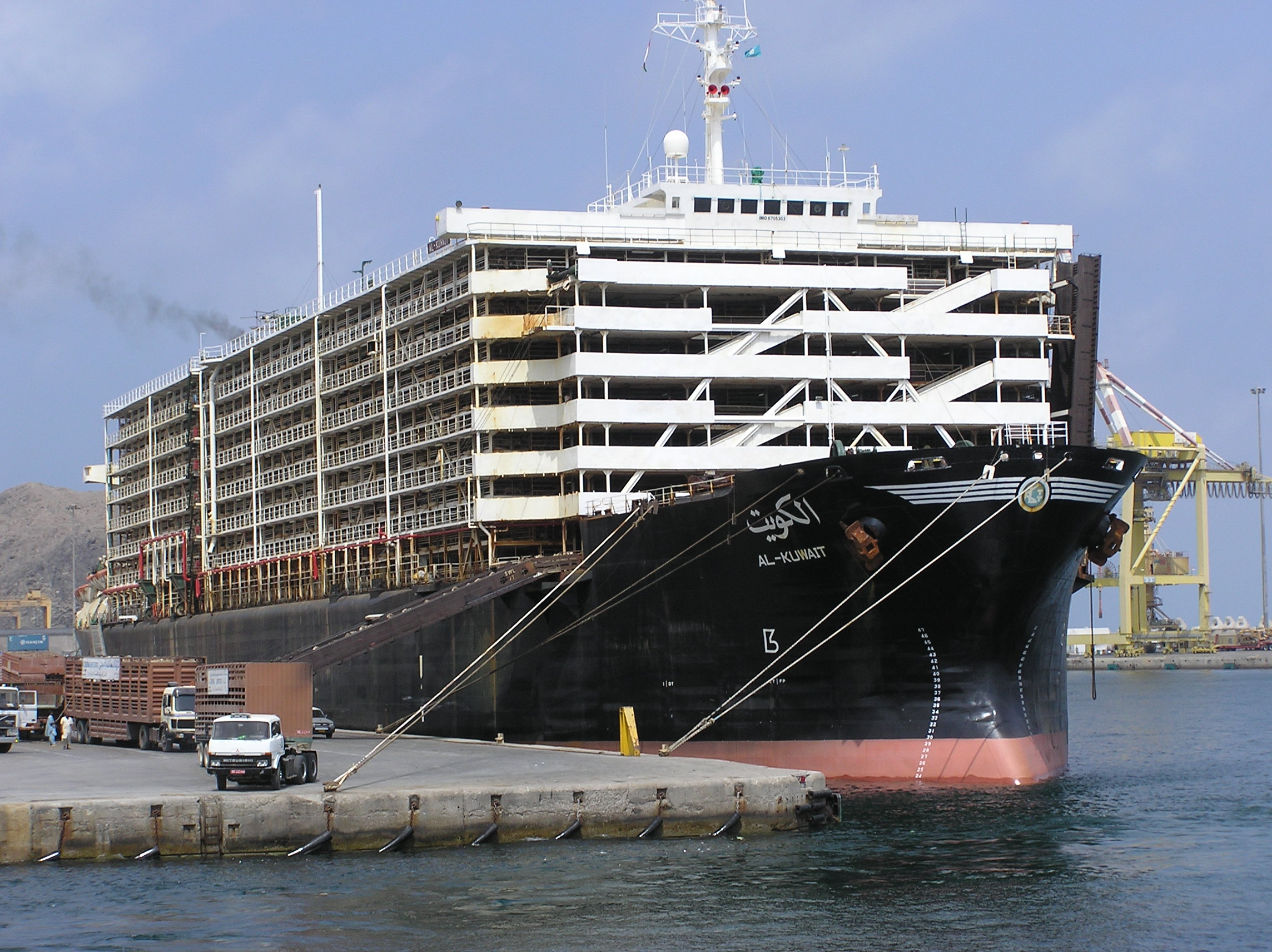
  An open livestock carrier with a cargo of sheep from Australia, docked in Oman

A livestock carrier is a seagoing vessel for the transportation of live animals. Typically it is large ship used in the live export of sheep, cattle and goats. Livestock carriers may be specially built new or converted from container ships.

==== Specialized cargo ship types ====
Specialized types of cargo vessels include container ships and bulk carriers (technically tankers of all sizes are cargo ships, although they are routinely thought of as a separate category). Cargo ships fall into two further categories that reflect the services they offer to industry: liner and tramp services. Those on a fixed published schedule and fixed tariff rates are cargo liners. Tramp ships do not have fixed schedules. Users charter them to haul loads. Generally, the smaller shipping companies and private individuals operate tramp ships. Cargo liners run on fixed schedules published by the shipping companies. Each trip a liner takes is called a voyage. Liners mostly carry general cargo. However, some cargo liners may carry passengers also. A cargo liner that carries 12 or more passengers is called a combination or passenger-run-cargo line.

=== Size categories ===
Cargo ships are categorized partly by cargo or shipping capacity (tonnage), partly by weight (deadweight tonnage DWT), and partly by dimensions. Maximum dimensions such as length and width (beam) limit the canal locks a ship can fit in, water depth (draft) is a limitation for canals, shallow straits or harbors and height is a limitation in order to pass under bridges. Common categories of dry cargo include:

- Handysize is a naval architecture term for smaller bulk carriers or oil tanker with deadweight of up to 50,000 tonnes, although there is no official definition in terms of exact tonnages. Handysize is also sometimes used to refer to the span of up to 60,000 tons, with the vessels above 35,000 tonnes referred to as Handymax or Supramax.
- A Seawaymax vessel is one of the maximum size that can fit through the canal locks of the St. Lawrence Seaway, linking the inland Great Lakes of North America with the Atlantic Ocean.
- Lake freighters, also called lakers, are bulk carriers operating on the Great Lakes of North America. Lakers have been used since the late 19th century to haul raw material from docks in the Great Lakes and St Lawrence Seaway regions to the industrial centers of Ontario, Quebec, and the American Midwest. The navigation season typically runs from late March through the following mid-January due to the formation of ice on the lakes.The largest lake freighters can travel up to 15 knots (28 km/h; 17 mph) and can carry as much as 78,850 long tons (80,120 t) of bulk cargo.
- Panamax and New Panamax (or Neopanamax) are the size limits for ships traveling through the Panama Canal. The limits and requirements are published by the Panama Canal Authority (ACP) in a publication titled "Vessel Requirements". These requirements also describe topics like exceptional dry seasonal limits, propulsion, communications, and detailed ship design.
- Capesize ships are the largest dry cargo ships with ball mark dimension: (Note: Measured in relation to the Plimsoll line and the Plimsoll disc or 'ball mark'.) about 170,000 DWT (deadweight tonnage) capacity, 290 m (950 ft) long, 45 m (148 ft) beam (wide), 18 m (59 ft) draught (under water depth). They are too large to transit the Suez Canal (Suezmax limits) or Panama Canal (Neopanamax limits), and so have to pass either Cape Agulhas or Cape Horn to traverse between oceans.
- Chinamax is a standard of ship measurements that allow conforming ships to use various harbours when fully laden, the maximum size of such a ship being 24 m (79 ft) draft, 65 m (213 ft) beam and 360 m (1,180 ft) length overall. An example of ships of this size is the Valemax bulk carriers.
- Baltimax is a naval architecture term for the largest ship measurements capable of entering and leaving the Baltic Sea in a laden condition.

Common categories of wet cargo include:

- An Aframax vessel is an oil tanker with a deadweight between 80,000 and 120,000 metric tonnes. The term is based on the Average Freight Rate Assessment (AFRA), a tanker rate system created in 1954 by Shell Oil to standardize shipping contract terms.
- Q-Max is a type of ship, specifically a membrane type LNG carrier. In the name Q-Max, "Q" stands for Qatar and "Max" for the maximum size of ship able to dock at the Liquefied natural gas (LNG) terminals in Qatar. Ships of this type are the largest LNG carriers in the world.
- "Suezmax" is a naval architecture term for the largest ship measurements capable of transiting the Suez Canal in a laden condition, and is almost exclusively used in reference to tankers. The limiting factors are beam, draft, height (because of the Suez Canal Bridge), and length (even though the canal has no locks).
- Supertankers are the largest oil tankers, and the largest mobile man-made structures. They include very large and ultra-large crude carriers (VLCCs and ULCCs) with capacities over 250,000 DWT. These ships can transport 2 million barrels (320,000 m^{3}) of oil/318,000 metric tons. By way of comparison, the United Kingdom consumed about 1.6 million barrels (250,000 m^{3}) of oil per day in 2009. ULCCs commissioned in the 1970s were the largest vessels ever built, but have all now been scrapped. A few newer ULCCs remain in service, only as floating storage and offloading (FSO) units as mentioned above, none of which are more than 400 meters long.
- Malaccamax is a naval architecture term for the largest tonnage of ship capable of fitting through the 25-metre-deep (82 ft) Strait of Malacca. Bulk carriers and supertankers have been built to this tonnage, and the term is chosen for very large crude carriers (VLCC). They can transport oil from Arabia to China. A typical Malaccamax tanker can have a maximum length of 333 m (1,093 ft), beam of 60 m (197 ft), draught of 20.5 m (67.3 ft), and tonnage of 300,000 DWT.
- The TI class of supertankers comprises the ships TI Africa, TI Asia, TI Europe, and TI Oceania (names as of July 2004). The prefix "TI" refers to Tankers International, the ultra-large crude carrier (ULCC) pool operator. The class was the first group of ULCCs constructed in 25 years.

== History ==
=== Cargo ships from the ancient world to the Mediaeval period ===
==== The ancient Mediterranean ====
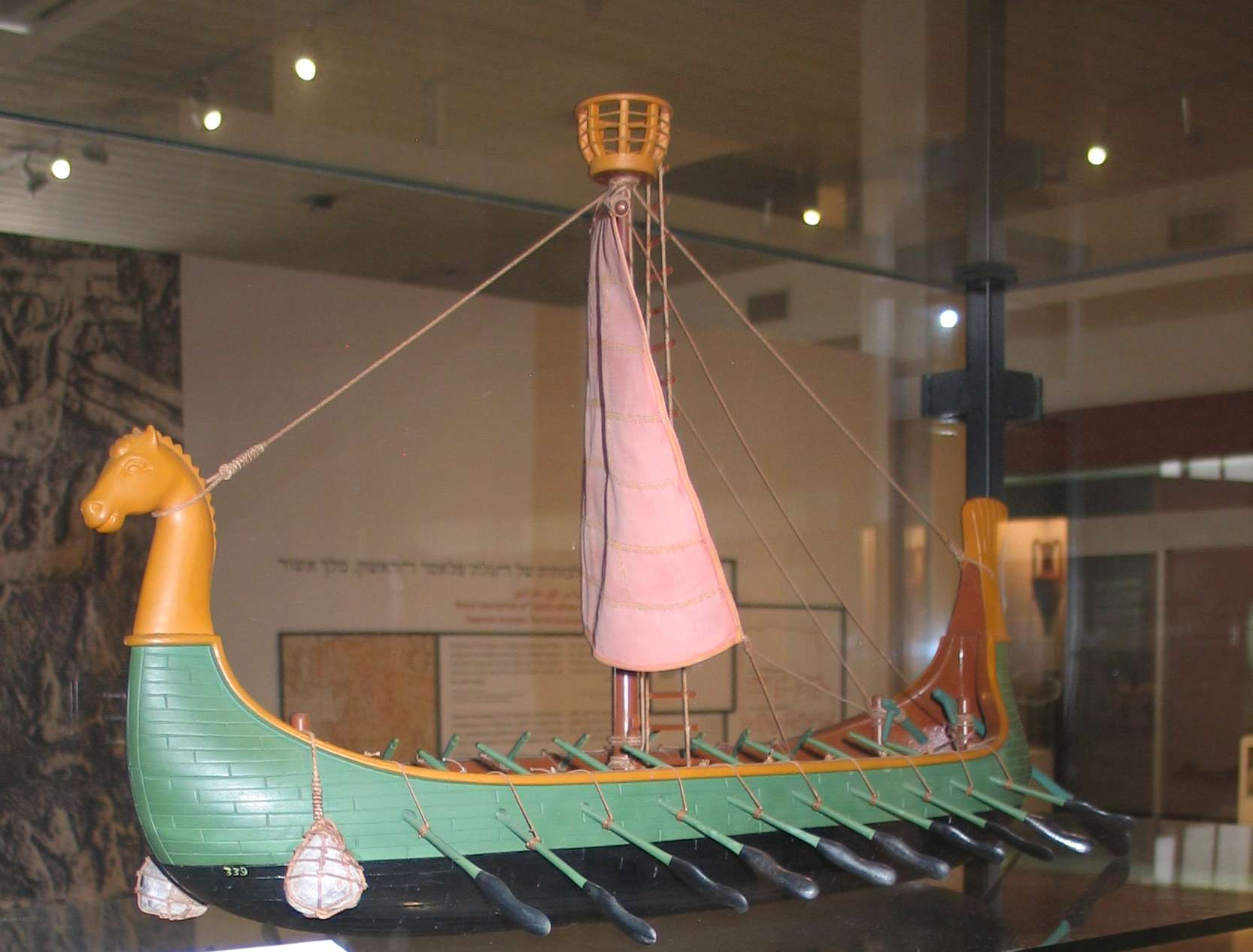
Model of a Phoenician merchant ship in the Haifa maritime museum, Israel

The earliest records of waterborne activity mention the carriage of items for trade; the evidence of history and archaeology shows the practice to be widespread by the beginning of the 1st millennium BC, and as early as the 14th and 15th centuries BC small Mediterranean cargo ships like those of the 15-metre (50 ft) long Uluburun ship were carrying 20 tons of exotic cargo; 11 tons of raw copper, jars, glass, ivory, gold, spices, and treasures from Canaan, Greece, Egypt, and Africa.

Phoenician cargo ships enabled extensive Mediterranean trade from the 12th century BC, carrying goods such as metals, glass, and textiles to colonies from Cyprus to Spain, even beyond the Pillars of Hercules, forming a vast maritime network central to Phoenician trade. Notably the broad‑beamed gaulos or “round ship,” were designed for stability, capacity, and long‑distance trade across the Mediterranean from c. 1200 BC. Built primarily from cedar using mortise‑and‑tenon joinery, they featured deep hulls, high freeboards, and a single square sail complemented by oars for manoeuvring. Archaeological evidence, including iconography and wreck analysis, shows these vessels could carry bulk goods such as timber, metals, glassware, textiles, and luxury items, enabling the Phoenicians to dominate maritime commerce for centuries.

Following the Phoenicians, the Carthaginians became the dominant maritime traders of the western Mediterranean from the 6th century BC, operating extensive routes to Iberia, Britain, and West Africa. Their broad‑beamed merchantmen, adapted from the Phoenician gaulos, featured sturdy hulls, deep holds, and single square sails, enabling the transport of bulk goods such as grain, metals, wine, and luxury items over long distances and through varied seasonal conditions.

Roman cargo ships, naves onerariae, were the backbone of the empire's maritime supply network from the late Republic to the Imperial period. Broad‑hulled and relatively shallow‑draft for stability and harbour access, they were built with mortise‑and‑tenon joinery reinforced by iron and bronze fittings. Most carried a single large square sail on a central mast, though some larger vessels added a foremast for improved manoeuvrability. The largest naves frumentariae (grain ships) could exceed 50 metres in length and carry hundreds of tonnes, far surpassing the capacity of earlier Phoenician merchantmen. Purpose‑built variants transported grain, wine, oil, stone, and other bulk goods, ensuring the steady flow of staples from Egypt and North Africa to Rome's urban population.

Between the collapse of the Western Roman Empire and the rise of Venice, Mediterranean cargo ship design evolved through a series of innovations introduced by successive maritime powers. In the early medieval period, the Byzantine Empire refined late Roman merchant hulls, drawing on the hydrodynamic qualities of the Dromon to produce lighter, faster vessels that could carry mixed cargo and passengers more efficiently. From the 7th century, the Arab Caliphates introduced the axial stern‑mounted rudder, likely derived from Chinese shipbuilding, alongside wider adoption of the lateen sail and hybrid hull forms blending Mediterranean and Indian Ocean traditions. These advances improved maneuverability, expanded seasonal sailing windows, and integrated Mediterranean trade into the Indian Ocean network.

==== The Italian maritime republics ====
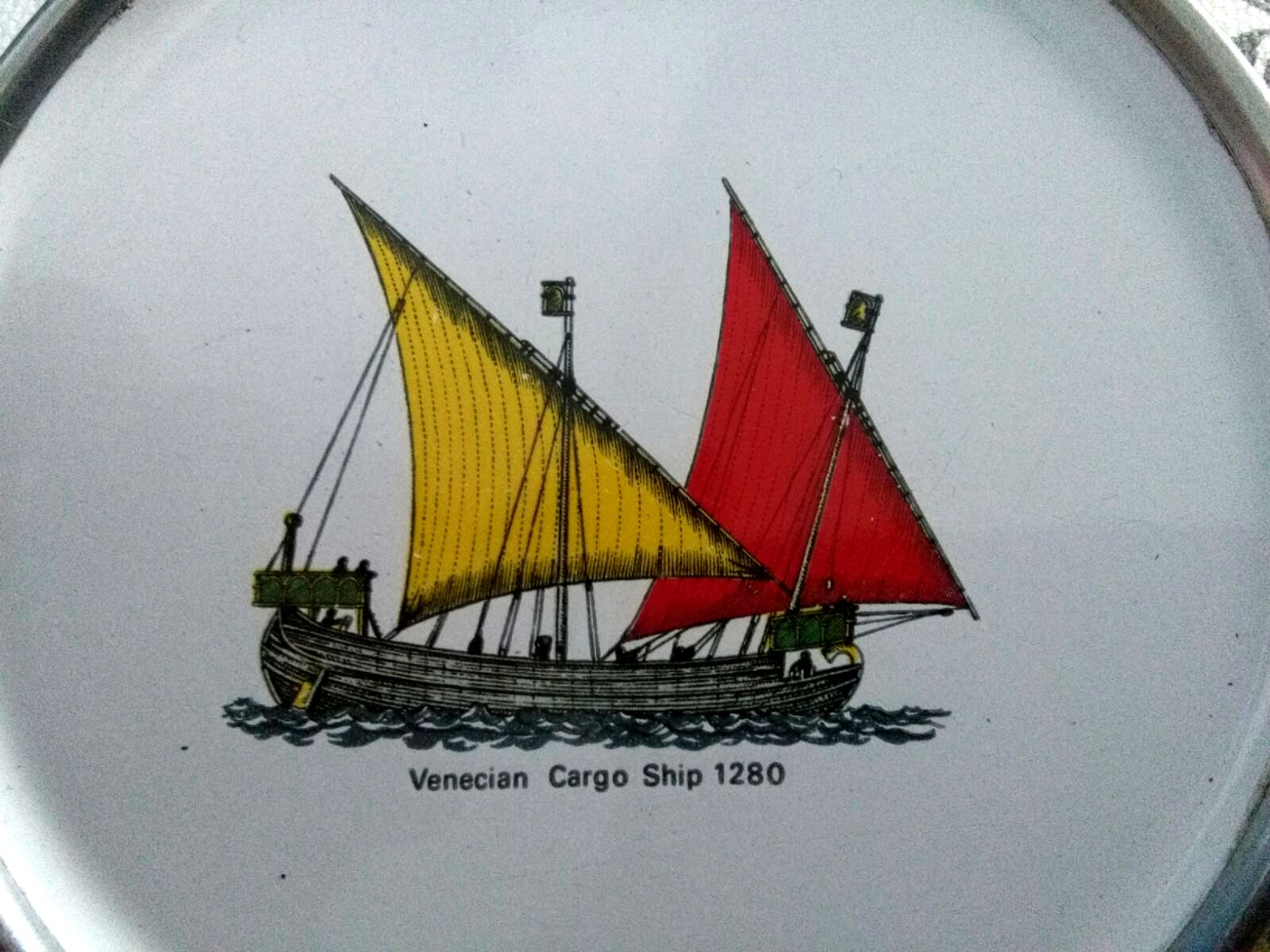
19th century Ceramic plate with an image of a 13th-century Venetian cargo ship

By the 9th to 11th centuries, early Italian maritime republics such as Amalfi and Gaeta developed the Nava, a broad‑beamed, high‑sided cargo carrier with reinforced framing for heavier loads, strengthening Italy–Levant trade. In the 11th to 13th centuries, Pisa and Genoa evolved the nava into the hulk, a capacious, ocean‑capable vessel, and experimented with merchant galleys that reduced oar banks in favour of expanded cargo space. By the 13th century, Genoa and Venice were building the carrack, a fully decked, multi‑masted ship combining square and lateen rigs with the stern rudder, enabling large‑scale, long‑distance trade beyond the Mediterranean and laying the foundation for the Age of Exploration.

From the 12th to the 14th centuries, the Republic of Genoa emerged as one of the leading maritime powers of the Mediterranean, building a merchant fleet that rivalled Venice in both capacity and reach. Genoese shipyards produced a range of cargo vessels, including the navis, a broad‑beamed, deep‑hulled sailing ship for bulk goods, and the bucius, a smaller variant suited to coastal and regional trade. Merchant galleys, adapted from war designs, were employed for high‑value cargoes such as spices, textiles, and precious metals, combining speed with defensive capability on long‑distance routes to the Levant and the Black Sea. Genoa's merchant marine was closely tied to its commercial colonies and trading posts, from the Crimean port of Caffa to North African harbours, and benefited from sophisticated financial instruments such as the loca, which allowed investors to share in the profits of individual voyages. By the late Middle Ages, Genoese shipwrights were contributing to the development of the carrack that would dominate Mediterranean and Atlantic trade in the 15th century.

From the 12th century, the Republic of Venice developed a highly organised merchant fleet that underpinned its dominance of Mediterranean trade. The state‑run muda convoys, sailing on fixed schedules to destinations such as Alexandria, Constantinople, and Bruges, combined cargo transport with armed protection. Venetian merchant galleys (galee grosse da mercato) were long, narrow‑hulled vessels adapted from war galleys, with reduced oar banks, expanded holds, and large lateen sails, enabling the fast and secure carriage of high‑value goods including spices, silk, and precious metals. For bulk cargoes such as grain, timber, and salt, Venice employed broad‑beamed round ships (navi tonde or cocche), which evolved into the multi‑masted carrack (cocca grande) by the 14th century. Central to this system was the Venetian Arsenal, a vast state‑owned shipyard operating on assembly‑line principles, capable at its peak of producing a fully fitted galley in a single day, ensuring the republic could maintain and rapidly replace its merchant fleet.

The desire to operate trade routes over longer distances, and throughout more seasons of the year, motivated improvements in ship design during the Middle Ages.

==== Mediaeval Northern Europe ====
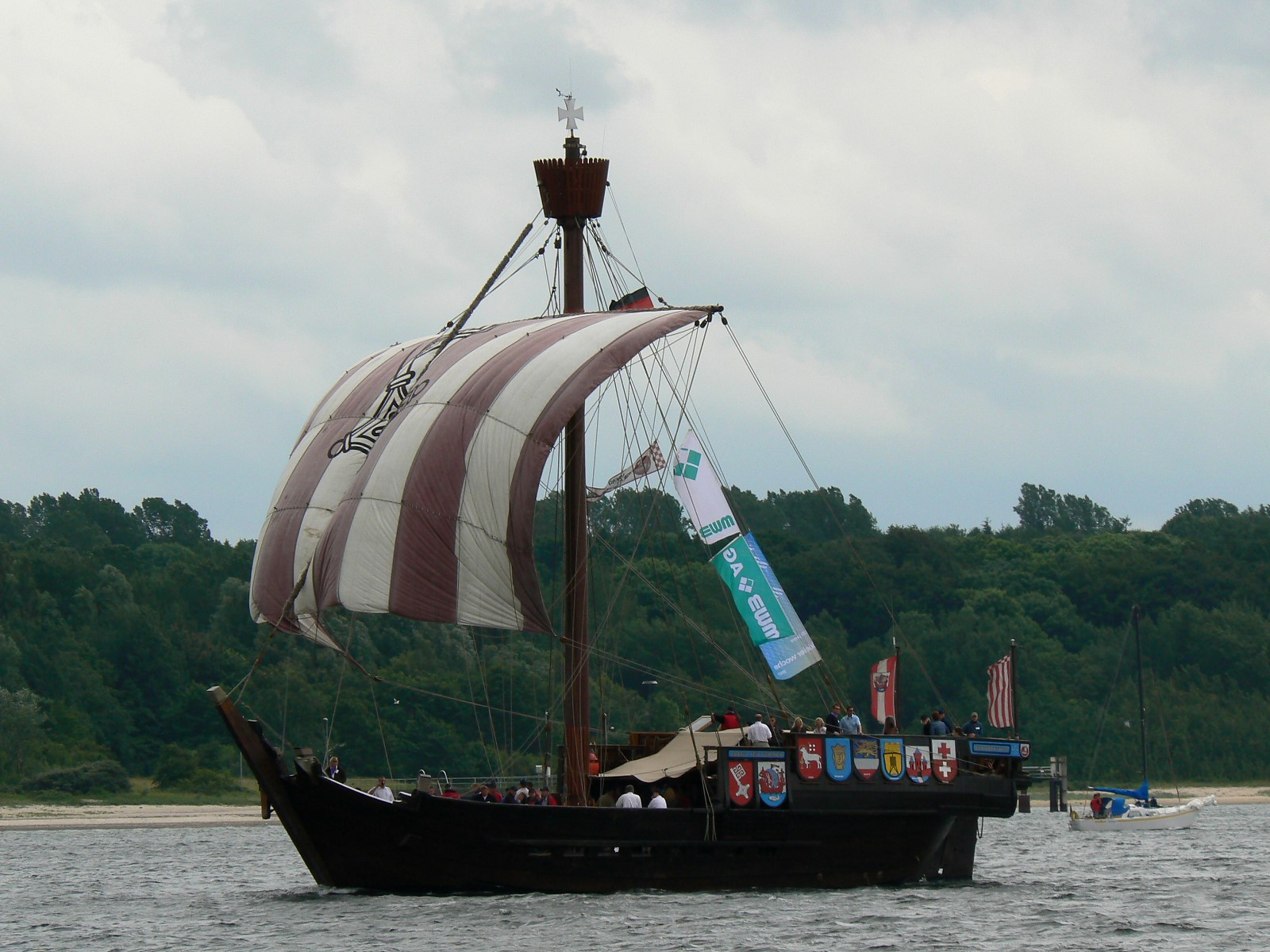
A full-scale replica of a cog, a type of vessel commonly used for cargo in Northern Europe from the 10th to the 14th centuries

During the Viking Age (c. 8th–11th centuries), long‑distance trade in northern waters was primarily carried out by the knarr, a broad‑beamed, deep‑hulled cargo vessel distinct from the longship. Clinker‑built with overlapping planks and a single square sail, the knarr could carry 20–50 tonnes of cargo and was stable in open seas while retaining a shallow enough draft to navigate rivers and land by beaching. These ships enabled Norse merchants to move timber, furs, iron, and luxury goods from the Baltic to the Mediterranean, and across the North Atlantic to Iceland, Greenland, and even Vinland. By the 10th century, the hulk appeared in records, possibly originating in the Low Countries, with strongly curved stem and stern and a capacious hull suited to carry bulk cargo.

From the 12th century, the cog emerged along the Frisian and Saxon coasts, eventually replacing Viking‑type traders in most northern waters. Early cogs were single‑masted, square‑rigged, clinker‑built vessels with flat bottoms and high sides, allowing them to settle upright at low tide for easy loading and unloading, and offering greater cargo capacity and security from attack. By the 13th and 14th centuries, mature cogs with fore and aft castles became the workhorses of the Hanseatic League, carrying grain, beer, salt, timber, wool and other types of cargo between Baltic, North Sea, and English Channel ports. Late medieval hulks, particularly in the Baltic, grew to rival contemporary great ships in size, while retaining clinker construction traditions.

By the late 15th century, northern shipwrights began adopting the carvel‑built, multi‑masted carrack from Iberia and the Mediterranean, replacing the single‑masted cog on long‑distance routes, marking the transition from medieval to early modern ocean‑going cargo ships and enabling northern merchants to participate in emerging Atlantic trade networks. The carrack's greater tonnage and improved seaworthiness allowed for heavier cargoes and extended voyages beyond the Baltic and North Sea.

In the late 16th century, Dutch shipbuilders developed the fluyt, a purpose‑built cargo vessel with a capacious hull, narrow upper works to reduce tolls, and minimal crew requirements. The fluyt became the workhorse of Baltic and North Sea trade, optimized for bulk goods such as grain, timber, and salt, and was instrumental in the Dutch Republic's commercial dominance.

==== Iberian Maritime Powers ====
From the late 15th century, Portugal and Spain developed merchant vessel types that underpinned their emergence as the first global maritime empires. Portuguese shipwrights refined the caravel in the 15th century — a light, maneuverable vessel with lateen or mixed rig, ideal for exploration along the African coast and into the Atlantic. By the early 16th century, the larger, ocean‑going carrack, the Nau, became the principal Portuguese cargo carrier on the Carreira da Índia, the annual round‑trip route between Lisbon and Goa, capable of transporting spices, textiles, and other high‑value goods from Asia to Europe.

Spain's merchant fleet was anchored by the nao and, from the mid‑16th century, the purpose‑built galleon; a hybrid of warship and cargo carrier designed to protect valuable shipments from piracy. The Spanish crown organised its transatlantic commerce through the Flota de Indias (West Indies Fleet), a convoy system established in the 1560s to safeguard treasure and goods from the Americas, including silver, gold, cochineal, sugar, and tobacco, while carrying European manufactures in return. These fleets sailed from Seville (later Cádiz) to ports such as Veracruz and Portobelo, regrouping at Havana for the return voyage to Spain.

A parallel Pacific route, the Manila Galleon trade (1565–1815), linked the Philippines to Acapulco, carrying Asian goods such as silk, porcelain, and spices to the Americas, from where they were transhipped overland to Veracruz and loaded onto the Atlantic treasure fleets. Portuguese and Spanish merchant vessels of this era not only moved vast quantities of cargo but also established the first permanent, globe‑spanning maritime trade routes, laying foundations for the modern global economy.

==== The Indian Ocean ====
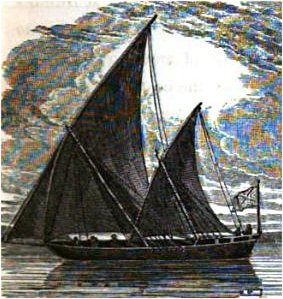
A pattamar dhow

India's maritime tradition dates back to the Indus Valley Civilisation, when the port city of Lothal (c. 2400 BC) in present‑day Gujarat featured one of the world's earliest known dry docks, indicating advanced shipbuilding and maintenance capabilities for riverine and coastal trade. Vedic texts such as the Rigveda (c. 2000 BC) describe large, well‑constructed boats and knowledge of established ocean routes, while the Atharvaveda refers to spacious, comfortable vessels, suggesting the use of substantial cargo craft for interregional trade.

By the Maurya period (321–185 BC), a formal Admiralty Division under a Superintendent of Ships oversaw navigation on seas, rivers, and lakes, reflecting the economic importance of maritime commerce. Indian vessels of this era traded as far as Java, Sumatra, and the Roman world, carrying spices, textiles, precious stones, sandalwood, and other high‑value goods. Classical sources such as Pliny the Elder record the scale of this trade, noting the outflow of Roman gold to pay for Indian exports.

By the early centuries CE, sewn‑plank and lashed‑lug vessels known today as dhows were a common sight in Indian Ocean trade. Characterised by one or more masts rigged with lateen sails, these ships were built in various regional styles, many using teak and other hardwoods sourced from the Indian subcontinent. Although strongly associated with Arab merchants, dhow‑building was a significant industry in Indian ports, and the vessels linked India to the Arabian Peninsula, East Africa, and Southeast Asia. Their capacity to carry bulk cargoes such as dates, grain, and timber, alongside high‑value goods like spices and textiles, made them central to the commercial networks of the western Indian Ocean.

From the 9th to 13th centuries CE, the Chola dynasty of southern India developed a powerful maritime network linking the Coromandel Coast to Southeast Asia and China. Chola merchant ships, often large, sewn‑plank or lashed‑lug vessels with high prows and sterns, were capable of carrying bulk cargoes across the Bay of Bengal and into the Straits of Malacca. These ships supported both commercial exchange and military expeditions, including the conquest of Srivijaya in the 11th century, and played a central role in the spread of Indian goods, technologies, and cultural influences throughout the Indian Ocean basin.

==== Ancient China ====
During the Zhou dynasty (c. 1046–256 BC), advances in riverine and coastal shipbuilding supported the growth of interregional trade along the Yellow and Yangtze rivers. Merchant craft of this period employed planked wooden hulls joined with wooden dowels and lashings, enabling greater cargo capacity for staples such as grain, salt, and textiles. By the Qin dynasty (221–206 BC), state‑sponsored shipyards produced larger, more robust vessels, some adapted for sea voyages to Southeast Asia. These ships incorporated stronger framing and improved steering systems, including early stern‑mounted rudders, allowing heavier loads and more reliable year‑round operation in support of imperial supply and colonisation efforts. Under the Han dynasty (206 BC – 220 AD), Chinese shipbuilding reached a new level of sophistication, supporting both inland and maritime commerce. Han merchant vessels, including early forms of the junk, featured flat or slightly rounded hulls with high bows, multiple masts, and fully developed stern‑mounted rudders. Hulls were often divided into watertight compartments, improving buoyancy and damage control, and enabling the safe carriage of heavier cargoes over longer distances. These innovations allowed Han traders to expand coastal and overseas routes into Southeast Asia, while maintaining extensive riverine networks that moved grain, salt, iron, and luxury goods between the empire's economic centres.

=== Cargo ships in the Age of Sail ===
==== 17th-century cargo vessels ====
By the 17th century, large, square‑rigged East Indiamen were being constructed by the Dutch, English, and Danes for long‑haul trade to Asia. These armed merchantmen combined substantial cargo capacity with heavy armament for defence against piracy and privateers, reflecting the high value of their cargoes and the risks of global trade.

==== 18th-century cargo vessels ====
During the 18th century, merchant shipping relied on a range of sail-powered vessels optimised for different routes, crew sizes, and cargo profiles. Large full-rigged ships and barques dominated long-haul oceanic trades, transporting bulk commodities and high‑value goods for charterers and companies engaged in intercontinental commerce. The smaller two‑masted brig and the closely related snow were common on coastal and transatlantic routes, valued for speed, manoeuvrability, and moderate crewing needs.

Fore‑and‑aft or mixed‑rig designs were widely used where labour efficiency and frequent port handling were important. The Schooner and brigantine ships (including topsail schooners and so‑called “hermaphrodite brigs”) combined relatively small crews with adequate performance in variable winds, making them effective for coastal commerce, fishing, and short sea trades. By contrast, the three‑masted barquentine balanced square sails forward with fore‑and‑aft sails aft to reduce crew requirements compared with full‑rigged ships while retaining good passage times.

Several regional types specialised for particular fiscal and environmental conditions. The Dutch fluyt maximised hold capacity within narrow upper‑deck dimensions—an adaptation often associated with lowering harbour dues assessed on deck breadth—becoming a mainstay of Baltic timber and grain trades and northern European carriage. In the Mediterranean, the xebec and polacca employed lateen or mixed rigs for speed and handling in coastal winds, servicing inter‑regional exchange and lighter cargoes.

By the later 18th century, contemporary usage increasingly classified merchantmen by their rig (e.g., brig, barque, schooner) rather than by hull form alone, reflecting the economic significance of sail plans for crewing, speed, and handling. These design choices shaped route selection, cargo economics, and the organisation of labour aboard sailing cargo ships at the end of the pre‑steam era.

==== 19th-century sailing cargo vessels ====
The 19th century marked the final phase of the commercial sailing ship era, as steam propulsion gradually supplanted sail in long‑distance trade. Merchant vessels of this period reflected both the refinement of established rigs and the emergence of new designs optimised for speed, crew efficiency, and specific trade routes.

Large full-rigged ships and barques continued to dominate deep‑sea cargo trades, with barques favoured for their reduced crewing requirements compared to fully square‑rigged ships. The barkentine combined a square‑rigged foremast with fore‑and‑aft sails on the remaining masts, offering a balance between speed and economy. Two‑masted brigs and brigantines remained common in regional and transoceanic service, while topsail schooners and multi‑masted schooners were widely used in coastal and intercolonial trades.

Specialised designs emerged for particular markets. The American clipper—a narrow‑hulled, heavily sparred full‑rigged vessel—was built for maximum speed in trades such as tea, opium, and gold rush passenger transport. In the Baltic and North Sea, the Dutch fluyt persisted in bulk trades, while in the Mediterranean, lateen‑rigged xebecs and polaccas continued in niche roles. By the late 19th century, very large steel‑hulled sailing ships, including four‑ and five‑masted barques, were constructed for bulk cargoes such as nitrate, grain, and coal, particularly on long routes where fuel costs made sail competitive.

Although steamships increasingly dominated high‑value and passenger trades, sailing cargo vessels remained economically viable into the early 20th century on long, low‑freight routes, marking the end of a maritime era that had evolved over centuries.

=== Steamship era ===
The introduction of steam propulsion in the early 19th century marked a major transition in cargo shipping, reducing dependence on wind and enabling more predictable voyage times. Early commercial steamships were often paddle‑wheel driven, such as the wooden‑hulled SS Great Western (1838), but the adoption of the screw propeller from the late 1830s improved efficiency, seaworthiness, and cargo capacity.

The first iron‑hulled steamship to go to sea, the Aaron Manby (1822), demonstrated the potential of metal construction for strength and durability. By the mid‑19th century, iron and later steel hulls became standard for ocean‑going cargo steamers, allowing larger holds and heavier loads. Steamships could maintain schedules regardless of prevailing winds, opening new trade routes and enabling the growth of liner services between industrial economies and colonial markets.

Specialised cargo steamers emerged alongside general freighters. These included refrigerated ships for perishable goods, colliers for bulk coal transport, and tankers for liquid cargoes. The expansion of global trade between 1870 and 1913 has been described as the “first wave of trade globalisation”, with steamships as a principal driver. Steam propulsion also facilitated the development of large tramp steamers, which operated on flexible routes according to market demand, and regular liner services that adhered to fixed schedules.

By the early 20th century, the steamship had largely supplanted sail in commercial cargo service, although some large sailing vessels remained competitive on long, low‑freight bulk routes.

=== Motor ships: Industrial Expansion and Wartime Logistics (1914–1950s) ===
The steam era laid the foundation for the motor ship age, as advances in marine diesel engines in the 1910s and 1920s began to replace steam in new cargo vessel construction. The transition from coal to oil-fired propulsion and the gradual adoption of diesel engines improved fuel efficiency and extended vessel range. World War I and World War II profoundly shaped cargo ship design and production, with the latter prompting the mass construction of standardized vessels such as the Liberty and Victory ships. These ships, built for wartime logistics, were later repurposed for peacetime trade, often undergoing structural modifications to increase cargo capacity and improve crew accommodations. The Victory ship class, introduced in 1944, featured improved speed and durability, and many were converted for commercial use in the postwar decades. These developments laid the groundwork for the next major shift in cargo shipping: the rise of containerization in the 1950s.

== Piracy ==
Before the middle of the 19th century, the incidence of piracy resulted in most cargo ships being armed, sometimes quite heavily, as in the case of the Manila galleons and East Indiamen. They were also sometimes escorted by warships.

Piracy is still quite common in some waters, particularly in the Malacca Straits, a narrow channel between Indonesia and Singapore / Malaysia, and cargo ships are still commonly targeted. In 2004, the governments of those three nations agreed to provide better protection for the ships passing through the Straits. The waters off Somalia and Nigeria are also prone to piracy, while smaller vessels are also in danger along parts of the South American coasts, Southeast Asian coasts, and near the Caribbean Sea.

== Famous cargo ships ==
Famous cargo ships include the 2,710 Liberty ships of World War II, partly based on a British design. Liberty ship sections were prefabricated in locations across the United States and then assembled by shipbuilders in an average of six weeks, with the record being just over four days. These ships allowed the Allies in World War II to replace sunken cargo vessels at a rate greater than the Kriegsmarine's U-boats could sink them, and contributed significantly to the war effort, the delivery of supplies, and eventual victory over the Axis powers. Liberty ships were followed by the faster Victory ships. Canada built Park ships and Fort ships to meet the demand for the Allies shipping. The United Kingdom built Empire ships and used US Ocean ships. After the war many of the ships were sold to private companies.

The Ever Given is a ship that was lodged into the Suez Canal from March 25 to 28, 2021, which caused a halt on maritime trade.

The MV Dali, which collided with the Francis Scott Key Bridge in Baltimore, Maryland, United States, on 26 March 2024, causing a catastrophic structural failure of the bridge that resulted in at least six deaths.

== Pollution ==
Due to its low cost, most large cargo vessels are powered by bunker fuel, also known as heavy fuel oil, which contains higher sulphur levels than diesel. This level of pollution is increasing: with bunker fuel consumption at 278 million tonnes per year in 2001, it is projected to be at 500 million tonnes per year in 2020. International standards to dramatically reduce sulphur content in marine fuels and nitrogen oxide emissions have been put in place. Among some of the solutions offered is changing over the fuel intake to clean diesel or marine gas oil, while in restricted waters and cold ironing the ship while it is in port. The process of removing sulphur from the fuel impacts the viscosity and lubricity of the marine gas oil though, which could cause damage in the engine fuel pump. The fuel viscosity can be raised by cooling the fuel down. If the various requirements are enforced, the International Maritime Organization's marine fuel requirement will mean a 90% reduction in sulphur oxide emissions; whilst the European Union is planning stricter controls on emissions.

== Environmental impact ==
Cargo ships have been reported to have a possible negative impact on the population of whale sharks. Smithsonian Magazine reported in 2022 that whale sharks, the largest species of fish, have been disappearing mysteriously over the past 75 years, with research pointing to cargo ships and large vessels as the likely culprits. A study involving over 75 researchers highlighted the danger posed to whale sharks by shipping activities in various regions, including Ecuador, Mexico, Malaysia, the Philippines, Oman, Seychelles, and Taiwan.

== See also ==
- Shipbuilding – Construction of ships and floating vessels
- Classification of European Inland Waterways – Standards determining vessel sizes on rivers and canals of Europe
- MARPOL 73/78 – International marine environmental convention
- Merchant Navy (United Kingdom) – Merchant marine service of the United Kingdom
- Merchant vessel – Civilian boat or ship that transports cargo or carries passengers for hire
- Ship prefix – Type of abbreviation used to describe ships
- Ship transport – Transport of people or goods via waterways
- United States Merchant Marine – U.S. civilian mariners
- Maritime history of Odisha

== Sources ==
- Thompson, Mark L. (1991). Steamboats & Sailors of the Great Lakes. Detroit: Wayne State University Press. ISBN 9780814323595.
