= Statement of Facts =

Statement of Facts (SoF) is a report listing all events during a ship's stay in port in chronological order and is used for the calculation of the lay time and demurrage. The Statement of Facts may aid in the resolution of conflicts by providing transparency and a precise documentation.

The Statement of Facts has usually a standardised form. It is written by the port agent or the shipmaster. It lists such things as the arrival and departure time and the time at the berth, the times in which cargo is loaded or unloaded, weather and other conditions that affect the cargo time, whether tugboats are used, etc. A frequently used SoF form is that of BIMCO.
