= Worldscale =

Unified system of establishing payment of freight rate for a given oil tanker's cargo

Worldscale is a unified system of establishing payment of freight rate for a given oil tanker's cargo. Worldscale was established in November 1952 by London Tanker Brokers' Panel on the request of British Petroleum and Shell as an average total cost of shipping oil from one port to another by ship. A large table was created as result.

The same scale is used today, although it was merged with the American Tanker Rate Schedule (ATRS) in 1969. By 2002, the table included the average cost of 320,000 voyages of different combinations of one load and one discharge port to five loads and ten discharge ports. Worldscale is produced by Worldscale Association (NYC) Inc. for the Americas and by Worldscale Association (London) Ltd. for the rest of the world. The freight for a given ship and voyage is normally expressed in a percentage of the published rate and is supposed to reflect the freight market demand at the time of fixing.

Following are some samples.

From Yokohama to:	US$/tonne	Miles
Adelaide	10.60	10,574
Aden	12.39	13,038
Chiba	2.90	50

In negotiating a price to pay, the above table is referred to as WS100 or 100% of Worldscale. The actual price negotiated between shipowner and charterer can range from 1% to 1000% and is referred to respectively as WS1 to WS1000, depending on how much loss the first is willing to take on that voyage and how much the latter is willing to pay.

== See also ==
- Oil tanker
- Ship transport
- Affreightment
- Chartering (shipping)
