= Affreightment =

Legal terminology

Affreightment (from freight) is a legal term relating to shipping.

A contract of affreightment is a contract between a ship-owner and a charterer, in which the ship-owner agrees to carry goods for the charterer in the ship by water. The contract may give the charterer the use of the whole or part of the ship's cargo-carrying space for the carriage of goods on a specified voyage or voyages or for a specified time. The charterer agrees to pay a specified price, called freight, for the carriage of the goods or the use of the ship.

A ship may be let, like a house, to a person who takes possession and control of it for a specified term. The person who hires a ship in this way occupies during the specified time the position of ship-owner. The contract under which a ship is so let may be called a charterparty—but it is not, properly speaking, a contract of affreightment, and is mentioned here only to clarify the distinction between a charter-party of this kind, which is sometimes called a demise of the ship, and a charter-party that is a contract of affreightment.

== Rules of law ==
The law with regard to the contract of affreightment is a branch of the general law of contract. The rights and obligations of the ship-owner and the freighter depend, as in the case of all parties to contracts, upon the terms of the agreement entered into between them.

The law, however, interferes to some extent in regulating the effect to be given to contracts. Certain contracts are forbidden by the law, and being illegal are therefore incapable of enforcement. The most important example of illegality in the case of contracts of affreightment is when the contract involves trading with an enemy.

The law interferes again with regard to the interpretation of the contract. The meaning of words in the contract, or—in other words—its construction, when a dispute arises about it, are determined by a judge or court. The result is that certain more-or-less common clauses in affreightment contracts have come before the courts, and decisions in these cases are treated practically—though perhaps not logically—as rules of law that determine the meaning of certain common expressions in shipping contracts.

The law acts in a third way—by laying down rules that regulate rights of the parties in the absence of an express contractual stipulation that such rules cover. This is done either by statutory enactment, as by Part VIII of the Merchant Shipping Act 1804, which deals with the liability of ship-owners—or by established rules of common law, as, for instance, the rule that the common carrier is absolutely responsible for the safe delivery of the goods carried, unless prevented by an act of God or enemies of the Queen.

These rules of law, whether common law or statute law, that regulate the obligations of carriers of goods by sea, are of most importance in cases in which there is an affreightment without any written agreement. It is, therefore, convenient to consider first cases of this kind where there is no express agreement, oral or written, except as to the freight and destination of the goods, and where, consequently, the rights and obligations of the parties as to all other terms of carriage depend wholly upon the rules of law, remembering always that these same rules apply when there is a written contract, except insofar as they are qualified or negated by the terms of such contract.

== In default of express contract ==
The rules of the common or ancient customary English law with regard to the carriage of goods were no doubt first considered by the courts and established with regard to the carriage of goods by common carriers on land. These rules were applied to common carriers by water, and it may now be taken to be the general rule that ship-owners who carry goods by sea are by the English law subject to the liabilities of common carriers. (See, as to the grounds and precise extent of this doctrine, the judgments in Liver Alkali Company v. Johnson (1874), L.R., 9 Ex. 338, and Nugent v. Smith (1876) 1 C.P.D. 423.)

In practice. goods are not often shipped without a written contract or acknowledgment of terms. For each separate consignment or parcel of goods shipped, a bill of lading is almost invariably given. When a whole cargo is carried, the terms are set out in a document called a charter-party, signed by or on behalf of the shipowner on the one part, and the shipper, who is called the charterer, on the other.

When there is no written contractual agreement, the rights of the parties depend on the rules of law, or on the warranties or promises that, though not expressed, are implied as part of the relationship between the shipper and carrier.

The obligations on the one side and the other are:

- The shipper must not ship goods of a nature or in a condition he knows, or ought to know if he used reasonable care, to be dangerous to the ship, or to other goods—unless the shipowner is informed or has sufficient opportunity to observe the dangerous character. The shipper must be prepared, without notice from the shipowner, to take delivery of his goods with reasonable despatch on arrival of the ship at its destination. The shipper must pay the agreed freight, and is not entitled to claim delivery until the freight is paid.

In other words, the shipowner has a lien on the goods carried for the freight payable in respect of the carriage. On the other hand, the shipowner is obligated to deliver the goods safely, and this obligation is, by common law, subject to this exception only that the shipowner is not liable for loss or damage caused by an act of God or the Kings' enemies. The statutes (part VIII of the Merchant Shipping Act 1894 (57 & 58 Vict. c. 60)), however, specify that the shipowner is not liable for loss that happens without his actual fault or privity, by fire on board the ship, or by the robbery or embezzlement of—or making away with gold or silver or jewellery of a nature and value not declared in writing at the time of shipment. Further, the shipowner is not liable for damage to or loss of goods or merchandise beyond an aggregate amount that does not exceeding eight pounds per ton for each ton of the ship's tonnage.

The shipowner is bound by an implied undertaking—in other words, is responsible under the law as if he had entered into an express undertaking: (1) that the ship is seaworthy; (2) that she shall proceed upon the voyage with reasonable despatch, and shall not deviate without necessity from the usual course of the voyage.

This article outlines the important obligations of shipper and shipowner, where no terms of carriage have been agreed, except as to the freight and destination of the goods, are such as have been described above.

== Bills of lading ==
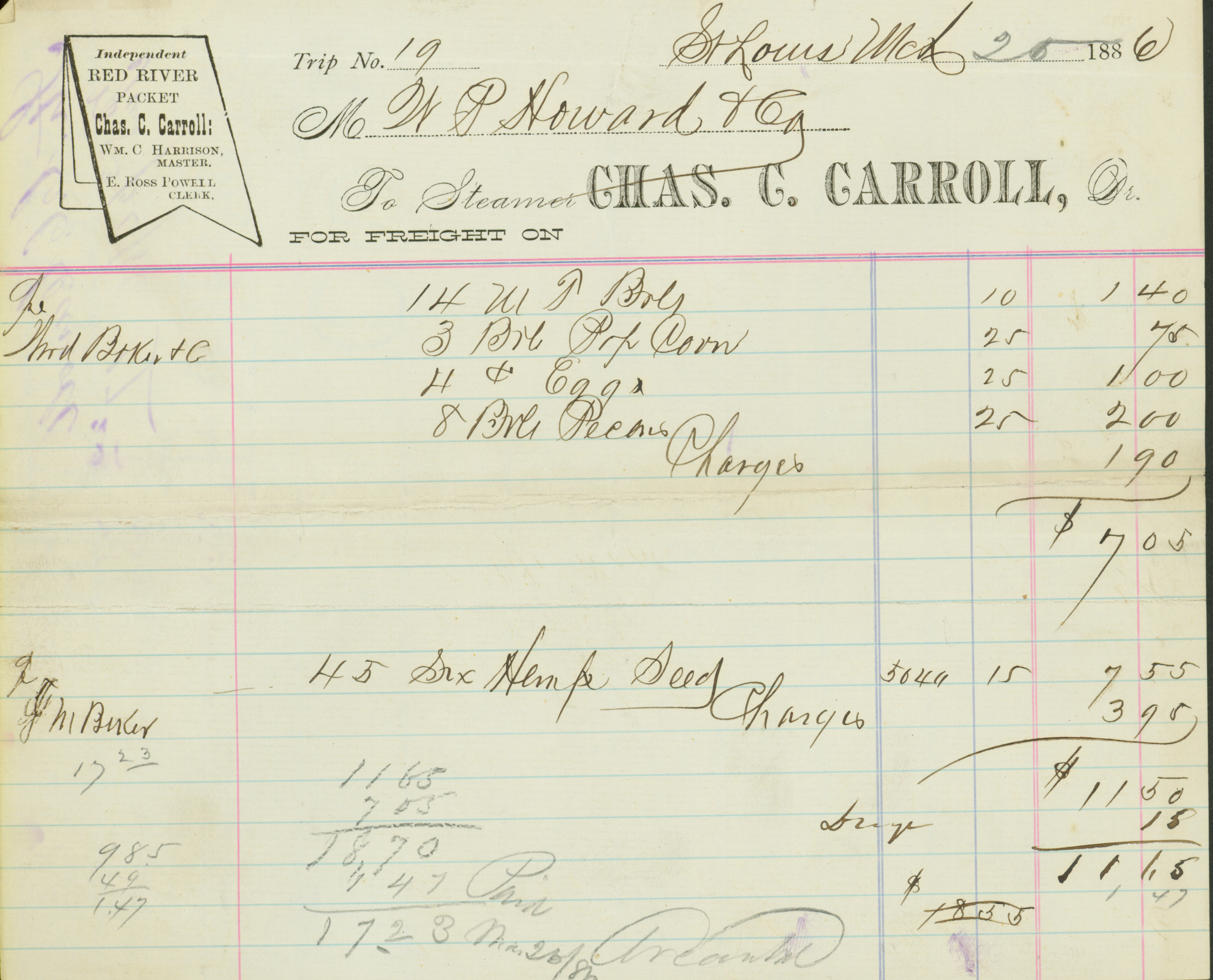
A bill of lading (1886)

A bill of lading is a document the master or agent for the shipowner signs (on behalf of the master) to acknowledge the shipment of a parcel of goods, and the terms under which it is carried. The document used today first appeared centuries ago as a bill (account) presented to shippers for all charges incurred by the cargo until properly secured on board.

In the Age of Sail, cargo and ships became lost more often than today. This bill proved that cargo expenses were paid, but became mainly a proof that the cargo was really on board and thus become a negotiable property title. Under this type of carriage, the bill of lading assumes two main tasks, as cargo receipt and property title. In liner shipping it assumes a triple identity: property title, cargo receipt and carriage contract. In tramp shipping, object of this wiki entry, the carriage contract is the charter party.

== Express stipulations ==
- It must not be supposed that even these primary obligations, which are introduced into every contract of affreightment not by express terms of the contract.
- It has now become common form to stipulate that the shipowner shall not be liable for any loss arising from the negligence of his servants, or that he shall not be liable for loss by the excepted perils even when brought about by the negligence of his servants.
- And with regard to seaworthiness, it is not uncommon for the shipowner to stipulate that he shall not be responsible for loss arising even from the unseaworthiness of the ship on sailing, provided that due care has been taken by the owner and his agents and servants to make the ship seaworthy at the commencement of the voyage.
- No rule of English law prevents a shipowner from exempting himself by the terms of the bill of lading from liability for damage and loss of every kind, whether arising from unseaworthiness or any other cause.
- In such a case the goods are carried at their owner's risk, and if he desires protection he must obtain it by insurance.
- In this respect the law of England permits greater freedom of contract than is allowed by the law of some other states.
- The owners, agents and masters of vessels loading in the United States of America are forbidden by an act of Congress, commonly called the Harter Act, passed on 13 February 1893, to insert in their contracts of affreightment any clause exempting the shipowner from liability for the negligence of his servants; but it is at the same time enacted that, provided all reasonable skill and care has been exercised by the shipowner to make the vessel seaworthy and fit for the voyage at its commencement, the shipowner shall not be liable for any loss caused by the negligence of the master or crew in the navigation of the vessel, or by perils of the sea or certain other causes set forth in the act.
- It is now very usual to insert in the bills of lading of British vessels loading in the United States a reference to the Harter Act, incorporating its provisions so as to make them terms and conditions of the bill of lading.

The difficulty of construing the terms of bills of lading with regard to the excepted perils, often expressed in obscure and inexact language, has given rise to much litigation, the results of which are recorded in the law reports. Where such difficulties arise debate arises as to the true and natural meaning of the language used by the parties. The words of the contract must always be considered with reference to these rules, which are founded on the well-established customs of merchants recognized and formulated by law.

The bill of lading sometimes contains a clause as to the shipowner's lien. Without any express provision for it, the shipowner has by common law a lien for freight. If it is desired to give the shipowner a lien for demurrage or other charges, it must be expressly provided for. The lien is the right of the shipowner to retain the goods carried until paid the freight charges, demurrage, or other charge for which a lien has been given. The lien may be waived, and ends with delivery of the goods, or by any dealing with the consignee inconsistent with a right of the shipowner to retain possession of the goods until payment has been made. The shipowner may preserve his lien by landing the goods and retaining them in his own warehouse, or by storing them in a public warehouse, subject to the conditions required by the Merchant Shipping Act (1894).

== Charter-parties ==
Charter-parties are mostly - as stated earlier in this article - for either a voyage or a period of time.

=== Voyage charter ===
A charter-party for a voyage is a formal agreement made between the owner of the vessel and the charterers, in which they agree that the vessel will load a specific cargo at a specific place—and the ship, once loaded will go directly to a specified place, or to a place to be named at a specified port of call, where the cargo will be delivered.

Some clauses specify the amount of freight to pay and the manner and time of payment. A clause may specify the length of time, usually described as lay days, for loading and discharging, and for the demurrage to pay if the vessel is detained beyond the lay days. There is usually also a clause that requires that the merchant bear the risk and expense to bring the cargo to the ship and collect it on delivery. Another clause specifies that the master must sign bills of lading for the cargo, either at the same rate payable under the charter-party, or commonly at any rate of freight (with a stipulation that, if the total bill of lading freight is less than the total freight payable under the charter-party, the charterers pay the difference to the master before the vessel sails). There is usually what is called the cesser clause, by which the charterer's liability under the charter-party ceases on shipment of the cargo, the shipowner taking a lien on the cargo for freight, dead freight, and demurrage. The charter-party is subject to exceptions similar to those in bills of lading. Typically, other clauses provide for commissions paid to the brokers on signing the charter-party, the address commission paid to the agents for the Vessel at the port of discharge, and other details. Clauses in charter-parties vary, but the above outlines what is typical.

Terms of a bill of lading as to the voyage, place of delivery, exceptions, excepted perils, and liability of the shipowner and his lien applies equally to charter-parties. Other terms are relevant here: demurrage, dead freight, and cesser, which are described below.

Demurrage is a fixed sum per day or per hour that the charterer agrees to pay for any time that the vessel is detained for loading or discharging over the time contractually allowed—usually described as lay days. Sometimes the number of days the vessel may be kept on demurrage at the agreed rate is fixed by the charter-party. If no demurrage is provided for by the charter-party, and the vessel is not loading or discharging beyond the lay days, the shipowner can claim damages for the loss suffered by the detention of the ship.

In other cases, if the vessel is detained beyond the fixed number of demurrage days, the ship owner can recover damages for detention. Sometimes the charter-party defines no fixed time for loading or discharging. In such cases the charter-party is obligated to load or discharge as quickly as possible. If loading or discharging is not done in a reasonable time, the shipowner can claim damages for detention.

The rate of demurrage (if any) is generally accepted as the measure of the damages for detention, but is not necessarily the true measure. When the claim is for detention and not demurrage the actual loss is recoverable, which may be more or may be less than the agreed rate of demurrage. The contract usually does not count Sundays and holidays as lay days—but unless expressly stipulated, this exception does not apply after the lay days have expired.

Dead freight is the amount of freight lost, and therefore recoverable by the shipowner from the charterer as damages if a full and complete cargo is not loaded according to the charter-party's terms.

The cesser clause has come into common use because, frequently, the charterers are not personally interested in the cargo. They may be merely agents, or may have chartered the vessel as a speculation to make a profit upon the bill of lading freight. The effect of the clause is that by the charterers shipping a full cargo, they fulfill all their obligations. The shipowner discharges them from further liability and takes instead a lien on the cargo for payment of all freight, demurrage, or dead freight that is payable. It has become established in the construction of the cesser clause that, if the language permits it, the cesser of liability is assumed co-extensive only with the lien given to the shipowner. In other words, the charterers are only released from liabilities that have been replaced by a lien given to the shipowner.

The shipowner is further secured by the stipulation that if the total freight payable under the bills of lading is less than the full chartered freight, the difference is paid to the shipowner before the vessel sails. Sometimes a difficulty arises, notwithstanding these precautions: even though the charter-party gives an ample lien, the terms of the bills of lading may be insufficient to preserve the same extensive lien as against the holder of the bills of lading. The shippers under the bills of lading, if they are not the charterers, are not liable for the chartered freight, but only for the bill of lading freight. Unless the bill of lading expressly reserves it, they are not subject to a lien for the chartered freight. The master may guard against this difficulty by refusing to sign bills of lading that do not preserve the shipowner's lien for full chartered freight. However a difficulty often arises from an improvident clause in the charter-party that requires him to sign bills of lading as presented. See Kruger v. Moel Tryvan, 1907 A. C. 272.

=== Time charter ===
A time charter-party is a contract between the shipowner and charterers, by which the shipowner agrees to let and the charterers to hire the vessel for a specified term for employment—either generally in any lawful trade or on voyages within certain limits. The time charter-party usually names a place where the vessel must be re-delivered to the owners at the end of the term, and the freight is payable until then. The owner almost always pays the wages of the master and crew, and the charterers provide coals and pay port charges. The freight is usually fixed at a certain rate per gross register ton per month, and made payable monthly in advance. Provision is made for suspension of hire in certain cases if the vessel is disabled. The master, though usually employed by the owner, must follow the orders of the charterers concerning use of the vessel. The charterers agree to indemnify the owners from all liability they may be exposed to by the master signing bills of lading or otherwise complying with the charterers' orders. The contract is subject to exceptions similar to those in bills of lading and voyage charter-parties. This is the general outline of the ordinary form of a time charter-party, but forms and clauses can vary considerably.

Under a time charter-party, the shipowner largely parts with control of his ship. The ship is employed, within certain limits, according to needs of the charterers. However, the shipowner remains in possession of the vessel via his employee, the master. The master remains responsible to the owner for the safety and proper navigation of the ship.

This means that the holder of a bill of lading signed by the master without knowledge of the terms of the time charter-party may hold the owner responsible for the contract the master signed as an employee of the shipowner—though, in fact, in signing the bill of lading the master acted as an agent for and at the direction of the time charterer. In the language of the ordinary time charter-party the ship is let to the charterers—but there is no true demise, because the vessel remains in the possession of the shipowner.

Where possession of a ship given to a hirer, who appoints his own master and crew, different considerations apply. However, though the contract by which the ship is let may be called a charter-party, it is not truly a contract of affreightment.

== Customary rights ==
Certain rights and obligations arise out of the relationship between shipowner and cargo-owner in cases of extraordinary peril or urgency during a voyage. Though not strictly contractual, these are well established by the customs of merchants, and recognized by law.

When a ship carries a cargo on a voyage, the master—to some extent—represents the owners of both ship and cargo. An emergency may require that the master, without waiting for authority or instructions, incur expense or make sacrifices as agent—not just for his employer, the shipowner, but also for the cargo-owner. Ship and cargo may be in peril, and it may be necessary for the safety of both to put into a port of refuge. There it may be necessary to repair the ship, and to land and warehouse, and afterwards re-ship the cargo.

For these purposes the master is obliged to incur expense, of which some, such as the cost of ship repairs, is for the benefit of the shipowner. Other expenses, such as warehousing fees, are for the benefit of the cargo-owner. Yet other expenses, such as port charges incurred to enter the port of refuge, are for the benefit and safety of both ship and cargo.

In a storm at sea, it may be necessary for the safety of ship and cargo to cut away a mast or to jettison (throw overboard) part of the cargo. In such a case the master, acting for the shipowner or cargo-owner, as the case may be, sacrifices part of the ship or part of the cargo to save the rest of the ship and cargo from a common danger.

Voluntary sacrifices and extraordinary expenses incurred for the common safety are called general average sacrifices and expenses. These are made good to the party who has made the sacrifice or incurred the expense by a general average contribution, which is recoverable from the owners of the property saved in proportion to its value. In other words, each contributes according to the benefit received. The law that regulates the rights of the parties in regard to such contribution is called the law of general average.

However, the owner of the cargo is entitled under the contract of affreightment to the ordinary service of the ship and crew for the safe carriage of the cargo to its destination, and the shipowner is bound to pay all ordinary expenses incurred for the voyage. He must also bear all losses that arise from accidental damage to the ship. However, when the shipowner incurs extraordinary expense for the safety of the cargo, he can recover the expense from the cargo's owner as a special charge on cargo. Also, when the shipowner incurs an extraordinary expense or makes a voluntary sacrifice to save the ship and cargo from a common peril, he may require the cargo owner to contribute in general average.

== See also ==
- Contract of carriage
- Glossary of nautical terms (disambiguation)
- Cargo ship

== Sources ==
- Carver, Carriage by Sea (London, 1905); Scrutton, Charter-parties and Bills of Lading (London, 1904). (W.)
- Huber, Mark (2001). "Ch. 9: Chartering and Operations". Tanker operations: a handbook for the person-in-charge (PIC). Cambridge, Maryland: Cornell Maritime Press. ISBN 0-87033-528-6.
- Turpin, Edward A.; McEwen, William A. (1980). "Ch. 18:United States Navigation Laws and Ship's Business". Merchant Marine Officers' Handbook. Centreville, Maryland: Cornell Maritime Press. ISBN 0-87033-056-X.
