= Shipping agency =

Agent responsible for handling cargo

A shipping agency, shipping agent, or ship agency is the term used to refer to the appointed companies that handle operational and procedural (legal) requirements for a commercial vessel's call at a port for the purposes of cargo handling (loading/discharging), emergency calls, repairs, crew changes, or ship demolition, and protect the general interests of their principals on behalf of ship owners, disponent owners, or charterers in an objective manner.

There are several categories of shipping agencies such as: port agents, liner agents, and own agencies, each rendering specific services depending on the shipping company they represent. This separation between different types of ship agencies depends on the main segments of the cargo transport systems which are bulk shipping, specialized shipping and liner shipping.

Today's shipping market has evolved into three separate but closely connected segments: bulk shipping, specialized shipping, and liner shipping. Although these segments belong to the same industry, each carries out different tasks and has a very different character. Therefore, under each segment, there are different functions, areas of responsibility, and operational tasks given to the ship agencies.

As the nature of ship agency business, the ship agent is any person or company that carries out the functions of an agent. Under English Law, an agency relationship arises when one person (who is called the agent) is considered by law as authorised to represent another person (called the principal) in such a way as to be able to affect the principal's legal position. They can be in business as a ship agent, or they perform such functions as an adjunct to, or conjunction with, other activities such as ship owning or operating, providing cargo handling, or similar.

Shipping agents will usually take care of all the regular routine tasks of a shipping company quickly and efficiently. They ensure that essential supplies, crew transfers, customs documentation, and waste declarations are all arranged with the port authorities without delay. Quite often, they also provide the shipping company with updates and reports on activities at the destination port so that shipping companies have real-time information available to them while goods are in transit.

== Tasks and responsibilities ==
The term "shipping agent" refers to the relationship between the principal (in this case the shipping company conveying the goods) and its representative. The principal, expressly or impliedly, authorizes the agent to work under his control and on his behalf.

The responsibilities/competencies as well as the remuneration of the agent may be explicitly entered into a contract which has been concluded between himself and the ship owner. This practice is very common in the cargo trade, booking agents, etc.

The duties of a cargo broker are similar to those of a shipping agent, but may also vary. For example, a cargo broker will also book outward cargo and inform the shippers on which quay and when the goods are to be presented and when loading and unloading is due to start. He will draw up booking lists according to the incoming bookings and ensure that the manifest department collects the shipping documents (shipping permits, bills of lading) which are necessary to commence the loading and unloading operations. The collected documents are also compared with the booking lists.

Responsibilities of Shipping Agents Include:

- Ensuring a berth for the incoming ship
- Arranging for the pilot and the tugs if necessary
- Drawing up the documents for the customs and harbor services
- Arranging for the necessary ship fresh water / provisions
- Arranging for a doctor in case the crew needs medical assistance
- Arranging for storage bunkers if these are needed
- Arranging for necessary repairs
- Conveying instructions to and from the ship owner
- Organizing the supply, transport and the handling of the goods
- Organizing the necessary contacts with the stevedores
- Collecting freights, cargoes
- Contacting shippers and the receivers of the goods

In the case of damage to cargo or the ship, the shipping agent also makes the necessary arrangements (at the request of the ship's master or owner) with the insurance company, and for nautical inspections and the services of experts or surveyors, etc.

The specific tasks of a cargo broker or port agent include:

- Providing the necessary information concerning the freight rates and the publication of the sailing lists
- Looking for cargo via notices and sailing lists
- Booking of cargo and the conclusion of the agreements
- Drawing up, initiating and delivering the required documents (booking lists, shipping permits, delivery orders) related to the cargo
- Contacting the shippers/forwarders with regard to the deliveries for shipment
- Fulfilling the necessary formalities regarding the delivery and reception of the goods (customs etc.)
- Settling cargo claims with insurance companies

== Fees ==
Shipping agents or port agents receive a fee called an agency fee for their services.

== See also ==
- Shipping portal
- Automotive safety
- Automotive industry
- Protecting agent (shipping)
