= Baltimax =

Largest ship that can enter the Baltic Sea

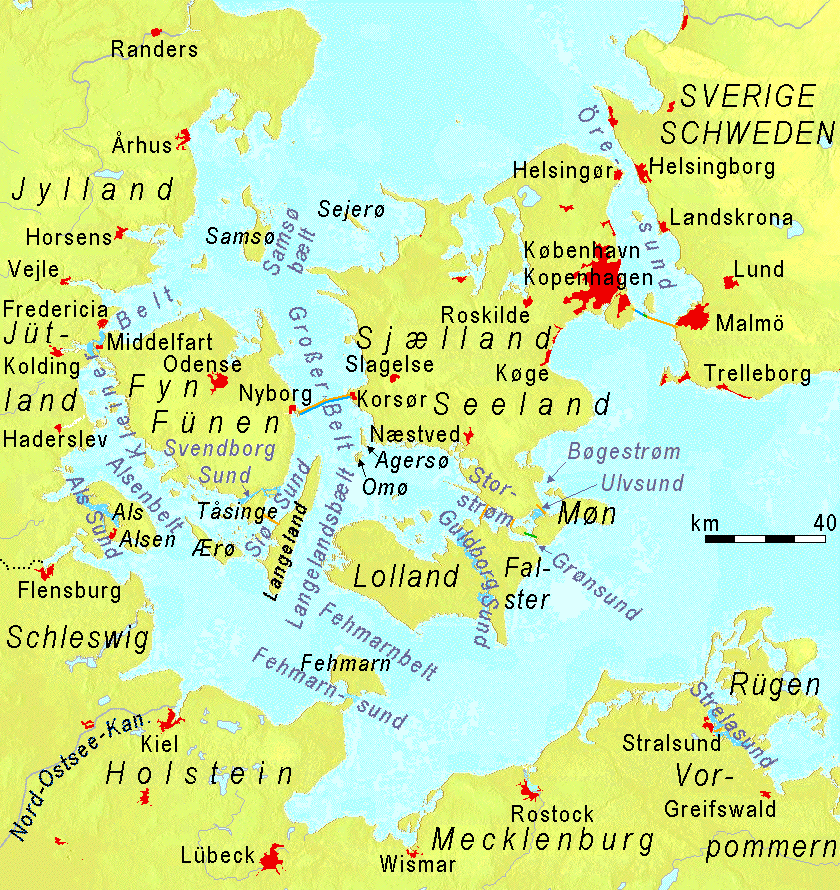
- The Danish islands and straits, which limit the Baltimax ship size

General characteristics
- Tonnage: 100,000 DWT..205,000 DWT
- Length: 240 m (787 ft)..400 m (1,312 ft)
- Beam: 42 m (138 ft)..68 m (223 ft)
- Height: 65 m (213 ft)
- Draft: 15.4 m (51 ft)

Baltimax is a naval architecture term for the largest ship measurements capable of entering and leaving the Baltic Sea in a laden condition.

It is the Great Belt route that allows the largest ships. The limit is a draft of 15.4 metres (51 ft) and an air draft of 65 metres (213 ft) (limited by the clearance of the east bridge of the Great Belt Fixed Link). The length can be around 240 m (790 ft) and the width around 42 m (138 ft). This gives a weight of around 100,000 metric ton.

Nevertheless, there are also certain larger ship types plying the Baltic Sea. Particularly the so-called B-Max crude oil tanker with more than 205,000 tons deadweight (68 m (223 ft) width, 325 m (1,066 ft) length) and the Maersk Triple E class container ship, 400 m (1,300 ft) length and 165,000 metric tons deadweight.

The Öresund allows only 8 m (26 ft) draft and is no alternative for large ships. The shortcut Nord-Ostsee-Kanal allows 9.5 m (31 ft) draft.

Furthermore, many ports limit ship size. The iron ore ports of Luleå (11 m (36 ft), to be deepened to 13 m (43 ft)) and Kemi (10 m (33 ft)) and the large port of Klaipėda (14.3 m to be deepened to 15.4 in the early future) have less draft than Baltimax. The largest port is Primorsk which has 15 m draft, similar to Baltimax. The Northern Port in Gdańsk can take the 300,000 ton 15 m draft ships.

Comparison of Baltimax with other ship sizes

== See also ==
- Ports of the Baltic Sea
