= Chartering (shipping) =

Activity within the shipping industry

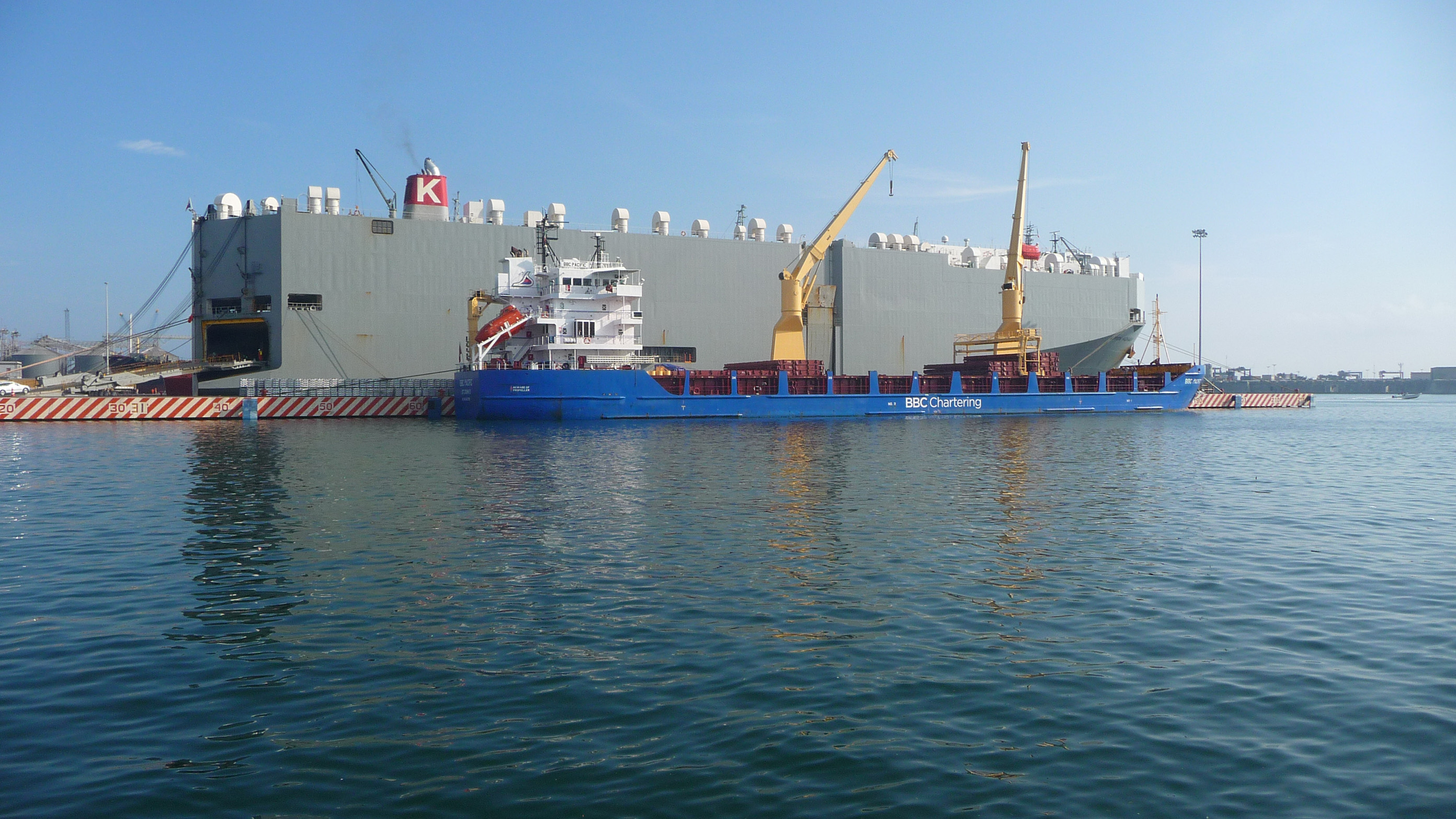
BBC Chartering

Chartering is an activity within the shipping industry whereby a shipowner hires out the use of their vessel to a charterer. The contract between the parties is called a charterparty (from French charte partie 'parted document'). The three main types of charter are: demise charter, voyage charter, and time charter.

== Charterer ==
In some cases, a charterer may own cargo and employ a shipbroker to find a ship to deliver the cargo for a certain price, the freight rate. Freight rates may be on a per-ton basis over a certain route (e.g. for iron ore between Brazil and China), in Worldscale points (in case of oil tankers). Alternatively may be expressed in terms of a total sum, normally in US dollars, per day for the agreed duration of the charter.

A charterer may also be a party without a cargo that takes a vessel on charter for a specified period from the owner and then trades the ship to carry cargoes at a profit above the hire rate or even makes a profit in a rising market by reletting the ship out to other charterers.

Depending on the type of ship and the type of charter, a standard contract form, called a charter party, is normally used to record the exact rate, duration and terms that are agreed between the shipowner and the charterer.

Time charter equivalent is a standard shipping industry performance measure and is used primarily to compare period-to-period changes in a shipping company's performance despite changes in the mix of charter types.

== Charter types ==
There are three main types of charter:

- A demise charter, or bareboat charter, is an arrangement for the hiring of a vessel for which no administration or technical maintenance is included as part of the agreement. The charterer obtains possession and full control of the vessel, along with the legal and financial responsibilities for it. The charterer pays for all operating expenses, including fuel, crew, port expenses and P&I and hull insurance. In commercial demise chartering, a subtype of bareboat chartering, the charter period may last for many years and may end with the charterer acquiring title (ownership) of the ship. In that case, a demise charter is a form of hire-purchase from the owners, who may well have been the shipbuilders. Demise chartering is common for tankers and bulk-carriers.
- A voyage charter is the hiring of a vessel and crew for a voyage between a load port and a discharge port. The charterer pays the vessel owner on a per-ton or a lump-sum basis. The owner pays the port costs (excluding stevedoring), fuel costs and crew costs. The payment for the use of the vessel is known as freight. A voyage charter specifies a period, known as laytime, for loading and unloading the cargo. If laytime is exceeded, the charterer must pay demurrage. If laytime is saved, the charter party may require the shipowner to pay despatch to the charterer.
- A time charter is the hiring of a vessel for a specific period of time. The owner supplies the vessel and crew, but the charterer selects the ports, route and vessel speed, the last being a significant determinant of carbon dioxide emissions. The charterer pays for all fuel the vessel consumes, port charges, commissions and a daily hire to the owner of the vessel. The charterer in that sense takes full commercial control of the vessel during the time charter period. The operation of the vessel itself remains with the owner.

Variations on those types include:

- A passenger cruiseship charter in which the hiring of a passenger cruise ship in regular service for a limited period of time is exclusively for a private function and uses all accommodations. That is often for business meetings or conferences, music festivals, charity fundraisers or global events such as the Olympic Games.
- A trip time charter is a comparatively short time charter that is agreed for a specified route only, as opposed to the standard time charter for which the charterer is free to employ the vessel within agreed trading areas.
- A bareboat yacht charter (in the leisure industry, the term "demise charter" is not used) is the short-term hire for only a few weeks or even less. The owner supplies the yacht in seaworthy order, and it is fully fuelled and possibly revictualled. The yacht may be part of a holiday flotilla and is sometimes crewed by an employee of the owner. At the end of the hire period, the charterers are expected to pay for the fuel that was used.
- A contract of affreightment is not strictly a charter contract but is somewhat similar to a voyage charter. Under a contract of affreightment, the shipowner undertakes to carry a number of cargoes within a specified period of time on a specified route. The agreed frequency of cargoes may require more than one ship. Unlike a true charter, the cargo-owner does not have a laytime period and is not responsible for demurrage.

== Charterers' Liability Insurance ==
Charterers' Liability Insurance is a type of insurance meant to protect shipping businesses from certain risk or liabilities. That could include fines and breaking of a law, cargo or vessel damage and physical injuries including and up to death.

Coverage of a Charterers' Liability Insurance can vary, based on the charter-party type and additional inclusions or exclusions that are arranged prior to the purchase of the insurance.

== See also ==
- Seaworthiness
- Laytime
- Demurrage

=== Related concepts in aviation ===
- Air charter
- Aircraft lease
