= Laytime =

In commercial shipping, laytime is the amount of time allowed, measured in days (or portions thereof), hours, or even tides, within a voyage charter for the loading and unloading of cargo.

Under a voyage charter or time charter, the shipowner is responsible for operating the vessel, and the master and crew are the employees of the shipowner, not the charterer. However, once the vessel has "arrived" at a port the charterer then assumes responsibility for the loading and unloading of cargo and has a period of laytime in which to carry that out. The actual loading may be performed by a third-party stevedore.

The moment that laytime commences is determined by a Notice of Readiness (or "NOR"), which the master or agent of the ship must give to the port when the ship has arrived at the port of loading or discharge. The charterparty contract determines the precise meaning of "arrival". Usually, "arrival" is when the ship has arrived at the port and is ready in all respects to load or discharge; but it may be, say, when the ship has passed buoy #2 in the approach channel, or once the vessel has pass through lock gates.

If the charterer does not comply with the NOR, the carrier may cancel the contract and seek damages. If the charterer's delay means that laytime is exceeded, a predetermined penalty (i.e. liquidated damages) called "demurrage" is incurred. If the whole period of laytime is not needed, a refund called "despatch" may be payable by the shipowner to the charterer. Despatch is normally paid at 50% of the demurrage rate, but that depends on the terms of the charterparty. The ship may thus be able to leave port early. Despatch does not normally apply to tanker charters.

== Case law ==
The legal case of Flacker Shipping Ltd. v Glencore Grain Ltd. (the Happy Day) raised a question regarding the need for a valid NOR to be issued where an earlier NOR was submitted but not valid. Potter LJ, supported by Lady Justice Arden and Sir Denis Henry, ruled that

Laytime can commence under a voyage charterparty requiring service of a notice of readiness when no valid notice of readiness has been served in circumstances where (a) a notice of readiness valid in form is served upon the charterers or receivers as required under the charterparty prior to the arrival of the vessel; (b) the vessel thereafter arrives and is, or is accepted to be, ready to discharge to the knowledge of the charterers; (c) discharge thereafter commences to the order of the charterers or receivers without either having given any intimation of rejection or reservation in respect of the notice of readiness previously served or any indication that further notice of readiness is required before laytime commences.

Another case in 2011, Suek AG v Glencore International AG (The "Hang Ta"), addressed a difference of interpretation between the parties to the contract as to giving of a NOR at "a usual waiting place" instead of at the intended discharge berth. The intended berth was occupied, and also access was affected by inclement weather conditions, so there were two contending reasons for the delayed berthing. Glencore argued that the NOR was given too early and was therefore invalid, because the berth's occupation by another vessel was not the sole reason operating to affect berthing, but the court rejected their argument and supported SUEK.

== Lay days ==
"Laytime" should not be confused with "Lay days". The latter refers to the period within which the shipowner should make the vessel "ready" to the Charterer at the place and time agreed in the charter party. "Cancelling Date" is the last day of "Lay days" and acts as a deadline to tender "Notice of Readiness". A ship (vessel) failing to become an "Arrived Ship" by tendering a valid Notice of Readiness bears the risk of being refused/cancelled by Charterers as per Charter-Party provisions.
