= Liner service =

Scheduled shipping service

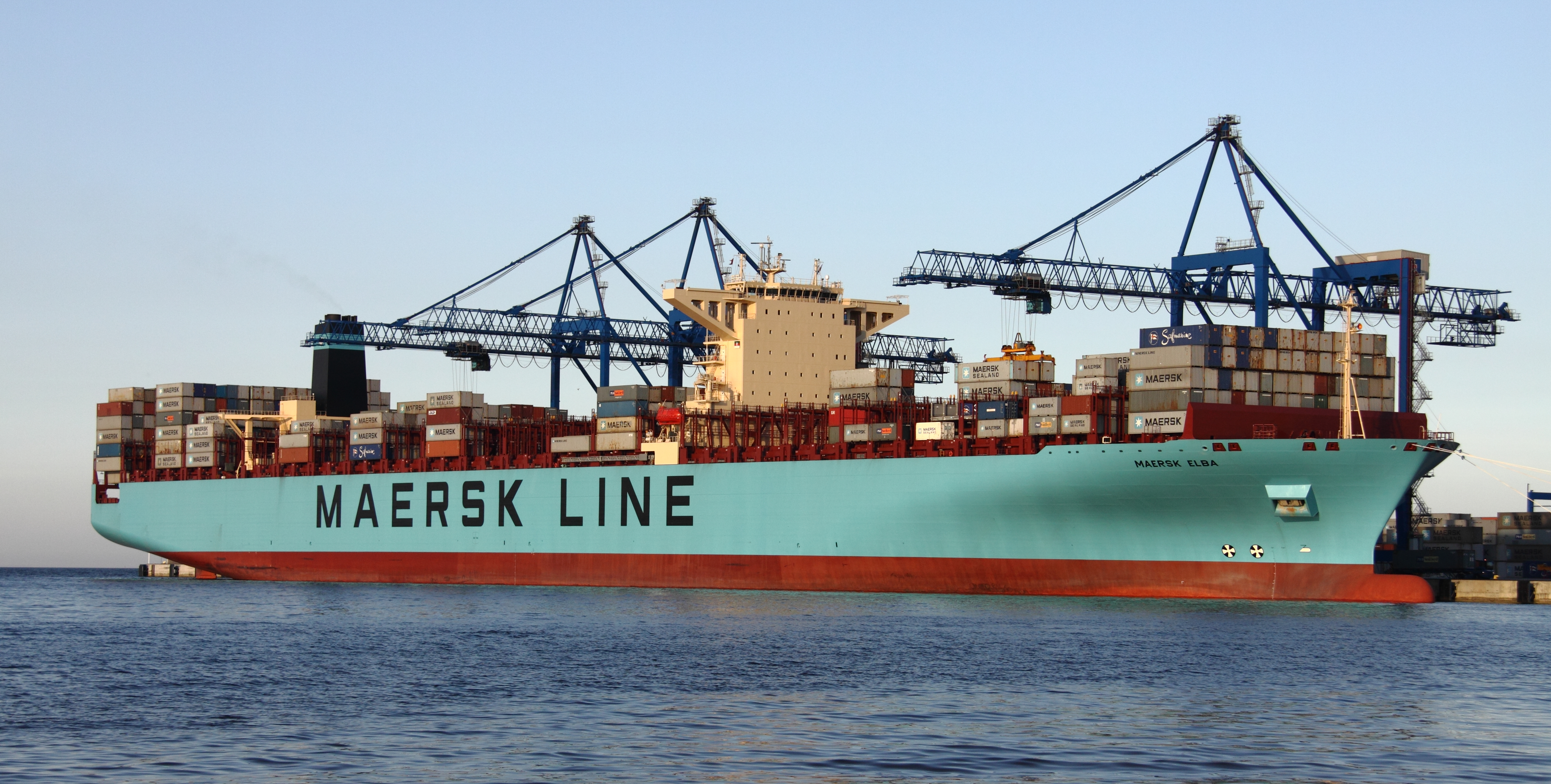
MS Maersk Elba container ship

A liner service in merchant shipping is a shipping service that operates to a timed schedule visiting a fixed loop of ports and operated by one or more ships.

== Service ==
A liner service is one of the two main classifications of merchant shipping, the other being tramp shipping. The service is expected to be regular, scheduled, repeated and published. From once established the frequency is generally expected to be no more than monthly, the actual frequency depending on the business available.

== History ==
The development of liner services, both cargo liners, and passenger liners, seems to have developed from the 1850s with the increasing adoption of steam power to attain more regular scheduled services.

Whereas up until 1956 cargo liners relied upon gears to handle variable sided loads, from about 1956 containers and cellular ships began soon after, with the increasing dominance of the container ship for trade.

== See also ==
- Ocean liner
- Cargo liner
- Tramp trade
