= Charterparty =

Maritime contract between a shipowner and a "charterer"

A charterparty (sometimes charter-party) is a maritime contract between a shipowner and a hirer ("charterer") for the hire of either a ship for the carriage of passengers or cargo, or a yacht for leisure.

Charterparty is a contract of carriage of cargo in the case of employment of a charter boat. It means that the charterparty will clearly and unambiguously set out the rights and responsibilities of the ship owner and the charterers and any subsequent dispute between them will be settled in the court of law or any agreed forum with reference to the agreed terms and conditions as embodied in the charterparty. The name "charterparty" is an anglicisation of the French charte partie, or "split paper", i.e. a document written in duplicate so that each party retains half.

== Types of charterparty ==
There are three main types of charterparty: time, voyage and demise and another.

- In a demise (or bareboat) charter, the charterer takes responsibility for the crewing and maintenance of the ship during the time of the charter. S/he assumes the legal responsibilities of the owner, and is known as a disponent owner.
- In a time charter, the vessel is hired for a specific amount of time. The shipowner manages the vessel but the charterer gives orders for the employment of the vessel, and may sub-charter the vessel on a time charter or voyage charter basis.
- In a voyage charter, the charterer hires the vessel for a single voyage, but the shipowner provides the master, crew, bunkering and supplies.

A bareboat charter operates as a long lease of the vessel, with the charterer completely in charge. In time and voyage charters, the shipowner still runs the ship, but when in port the charterer becomes responsible for loading and unloading the ship within the agreed period of laytime. If the charterer exceeds the allowed laytime, demurrage becomes payable.

In a voyage charter, the route is pre-arranged and the charterer has little scope to interfere with the programme. By contrast, the time charter is almost a halfway-house between a demise charter and a voyage charter, in that the charterer decides on the voyages and the ports, and instructs the shipowner's crew to comply. This can lead to issues of indemnity: whereas the shipowner in a voyage charter takes responsibility for the ship, in a time charter the shipowner may need to be indemnified against losses or liabilities proximately caused by the charterer.

== Legal aspects of charterparties ==
Whereas a charterparty is the contract between a shipowner and a charterer, a contract of carriage lies between the shipper and the carrier. A carrier will issue a shipper with a bill of lading, a receipt for cargo shipped which also serves as evidence of the contract of carriage. (In a demise charter, the charterer is the carrier; in a time or voyage charter the shipowner is the carrier).

The US Carriage of Goods by Sea Act (COGSA), and the UK Carriage of Goods by Sea Act 1971 (which ratifies and incorporates the Hague-Visby Rules) do NOT apply to charterparties, but do apply to bills of lading (and similar documents such as ships delivery orders, or sea waybills).

When a bill of lading is issued to a charterer by the shipowner, the question arises as to which is the dominant document. If a shipper returns a bill of lading to a carrier (perhaps as a pledge), the carrier will hold it only as a token of the pledge.

In both USA and the UK, the COGSA legislation provide a statement of the minimum duties that a carrier owes to the cargo-owner. If the charterer has shipped cargo, charterparty document may incorporate the COGSA or the Harter Act, since the charter is also a cargo-owner. Such an incorporation is valid and enforceable even without the issuance of a bill of lading. In the reverse case, if a carrier issues a third-party shipper with a bill of lading that incorporates charterparty terms, the shipper/cargo-owner would not be liable for fees such as demurrage, which are payable only by a charter.

Lawsuits brought for the breach of an obligation under a charterparty fall within admiralty jurisdiction. If a breach of charter terms creates a maritime lien, the suit may be in rem (i.e. against the vessel itself).

In pleasure boating, the most frequent charter arrangement is bareboat yacht charter. A voyage or time charter is used only for larger yachts and is uncommon. Yacht charter flotillas are mostly made up of boats belonging to individuals or companies who only use their boats on a part-time basis or as an investment. A recent innovation in recreational boating is "time-share chartering" whereby several charterers are assigned a certain number of days per month or season in a manner which resembles real-estate time-share.

== Typical clauses ==
A charterparty may contain these clauses.

=== Bunker clause ===
A bunker clause stipulates that the charterer shall accept and pay for all fuel oil in the vessel's bunkers at port of delivery and conversely, (owners) shall pay for all fuel oil in the vessel's bunkers at port of re-delivery at current price at the respective ports. It is customary to agree upon a certain minimum and maximum quantity in bunkers on re-delivery of the vessel. Since the OW Bunker test case, ship operators need to take care to ensure that bunker supply terms are suitable.

=== Ship clause ===
Under this clause, the owner of the ship writes clearly that the ship would be seaworthy at the start of the voyage in every respect, in other words, the ship would be appropriate to travel to the country for which it is taken.

=== Ice clause ===
An ice clause is inserted in a bill of lading or a charterparty when a vessel is bound for a port or ports which may be closed to shipping by ice when the vessel arrives or after the vessel's arrival.

=== Lighterage clause ===
A lighterage clause is inserted into charter-parties which show as port of discharge any safe port in a certain range, e.g. Havre/Hamburg range.

=== Negligence clause ===
A negligence clause tends to exclude shipowner's or carrier's liability for loss or damage resulting from an act, default or neglect of the master, mariner, pilot or the servants of the carrier in the navigation of manoeuvring of a ship, not resulting, however, from want of due diligence by the owners of the ship or any of them or by the ship's husband or manager.

=== Ready berth clause ===
A ready berth clause is inserted in a charterparty, i.e. a stipulation to the effect that lay days will begin to count as soon as the vessel has arrived at the port of loading or discharge "whether in berth or not". It protects shipowner's interests against delays which arise from ships having to wait for a berth.

== See also ==
- Air charter
